The Presidential Early Career Award for Scientists and Engineers (PECASE) is the highest honor bestowed by the United States government on outstanding scientists and engineers in the early stages of their independent research careers. The White House, following recommendations from participating agencies, confers the awards annually. To be eligible for a Presidential Award, an individual must be a US citizen, national or permanent resident. Some of the winning scientists and engineers receive up to a five-year research grant.

History 
In February 1996, the National Science and Technology Council (NSTC), was commissioned by President Bill Clinton to create an award program that would honor and support the achievements of young professionals at the outset of their independent research careers in the fields of science and technology. The stated aim of the award is to help maintain the leadership position of the United States in science.
Originally, 60 recipients received the PECASE award per year. Due to increased participation by the Department of Defense, this has increased to 100 per year.
The 2002 PECASE awards were not announced until May 2004 due to bureaucratic delays within the Bush administration.
The 2013 PECASE awards were announced in February 2016 after a 2-year delay.
The Trump administration announced the 2015, 2016, and 2017 awardees in 2019 with the awards being presented by the White House Office of Science and Technology Policy.

Agencies 
The agencies participating in the PECASE Awards program are:
 Department of Agriculture
 Department of Commerce
 Department of Defense
 Department of Energy
 Department of Education
 Department of Health and Human Services: National Institutes of Health
 Department of the Interior: United States Geological Survey
 Department of Transportation
 Department of Veterans Affairs
 Environmental Protection Agency
 National Aeronautics and Space Administration
 National Science Foundation
 Smithsonian Institution
 United States Intelligence Community

Recipients

1996

Following the creation of PECASE in February 1996, President Bill Clinton announced the first recipients on December 16 of that year:

Department of Agriculture

 Pina Fratamico, Agricultural Research Service
 Barbara Gartner, Oregon State University
 Kenton Rodgers, North Dakota State University

Department of Commerce

 Eric Cornell, NIST Physics Laboratory
 John Daniel, NOAA Environmental Research Laboratories
 Roland Pozo, NIST Computing and Applied Mathematics Laboratory
 David Stensrud, NOAA Environmental Research Laboratories

Department of Defense

 Andrea Bertozzi, Duke University
 Nesbitt Hagood, Massachusetts Institute of Technology
 Gail Kineke, University of South Carolina
 Paul Laibinis, Massachusetts Institute of Technology
 Venkatakrishnan Selvamanickam, Intermagnetics General Corporation
 Peter Sercel, University of Oregon

Department of Energy

 Shenda M. Baker, Los Alamos National Laboratory
 Richard A. Cairncross, Sandia National Laboratories
 Christine Hartmann, Lawrence Livermore National Laboratory
 John P. Hill, Brookhaven National Laboratory
 Philip M. Jardine, Oak Ridge National Laboratory
 Michael Smith, Oak Ridge National Laboratory

Department of Veterans Affairs

 Melissa Clark, VA Medical Center, Nashville, Tennessee and Vanderbilt University
 Joseph Cubells, VA Medical Center, West Haven, Connecticut and Yale University

Environmental Protection Agency

 David Barnes, University of Arkansas
 Keith Grasman, Wright State University
 Qing-Huo Liu, New Mexico State University

National Aeronautics and Space Administration

 Dora Angelaki, University of Mississippi Medical Center
 Christopher Chyba, Princeton University
 Andrea Donnellan, Jet Propulsion Laboratory
 Heidi Sosik, Woods Hole Oceanographic Institution
 Ellen Stofan, Jet Propulsion Laboratory
 Kimberly Weaver, Johns Hopkins University

National Institutes of Health

 Allison Doupe, University of California, San Francisco
 Ali Hemmati-Brivanlou, Rockefeller University
 Paul Khavari, Stanford University
 Aron Lukacher, Emory University
 Deirdre Meldrum, University of Washington
 Lee Ann Niswander, Sloan-Kettering Cancer Institute for Cancer Research
 David Self, Yale University
 Morgan Sheng, Massachusetts General Hospital
 Mark Walter, University of Alabama, Birmingham
 Keith Woerpel, University of California, Irvine

National Science Foundation

 David T. Burke, University of Michigan
 Erick M. Carreira, California Institute of Technology
 Fengshan Frank Chen, Florida International University
 Peter J. Delfyett Jr., University of Central Florida
 Juan J. de Pablo, University of Wisconsin at Madison
 Bonnie J. Dorr, University of Maryland
 Weinan E, New York University
 Marc A. Edwards, University of Colorado
 Mark A. Gluck, Rutgers University
 Marilyn R. Gunner, City College of the City University of New York
 Daniel P. Hess, University of South Florida
 Robert T. Kennedy, University of Florida
 Michael R. Kremer, Massachusetts Institute of Technology
 Charles M. Marcus, Stanford University
 Massoud Pedram, University of Southern California
 Ruey-Jen Hwu Sadwick, University of Utah
 John W. Sutherland, Michigan Technical University
 Todd A. Verdoorn, Vanderbilt University Medical Center
 Michael E. Wysession, Washington University
 John Yin, Dartmouth College

1997

On October 23, 1997, President Bill Clinton announced the recipients of the PECASE for that year:

Department of Agriculture
 Eric J. Gustafson, North Central Forest Experiment Station
 Laura Lee McConnell, Environmental Chemistry Laboratory
 Sara L. F. Sunden, University of Illinois at Urbana–Champaign

Department of Commerce
 Gregory T. Linteris, Building and Fire Research Laboratory, NIST
 Christopher R. Monroe, Physics Laboratory, NIST
 Erik N. Rasmussen, University of Oklahoma
 Thomas J. Silva, Electronics and Electrical Engineering Laboratory, NIST

Department of Defense
 Nicholas L. Abbott, University of California, Davis
 David S. Citrin, Washington State University
 Robert L. Clark Jr., Duke University
 Elliot Douglas, University of Florida
 Joel T. Johnson, Ohio State University
 Ying-Cheng Lai, University of Kansas
 Peter Schiffer, University of Notre Dame

Department of Energy
 Bruno S. Bauer, Los Alamos National Laboratory
 Andrew Brandt, Fermi National Accelerator Laboratory
 David J. Dean, Oak Ridge National Laboratory
 Lori A. Freitag, Argonne National Laboratory
 Thomas J. Matula, Lawrence Livermore National Laboratory
 David E. Newman, Oak Ridge National Laboratory
 John Shanklin, Brookhaven National Laboratory

Department of Veterans' Affairs
 J. Michael Gaziano, VA Medical Center
 Martin R. Gluck, VA Medical Center

National Aeronautics and Space Administration
 Elfatih A. B. Eltahir, Massachusetts Institute of Technology
 Jonathan A. Foley, University of Wisconsin at Madison
 Cila Herman, Johns Hopkins University
 Mark V. Hurwitz, University of California at Berkeley
 Todd T. Schlegel, Johnson Space Center
 Eun-Suk Seo, University of Maryland at College Park

National Institutes of Health
 Russ B. Altman, Stanford University
 Anirvan Ghosh, Johns Hopkins School of Medicine
 Juan Carlos Izpisua Belmonte, Salk Institute
 Macrae F. Linton, Vanderbilt University
 Peter Mombaerts, Rockefeller University
 Michael K. Rosen, Sloan-Kettering Cancer Institute for Cancer Research
 Patrick J. Stover, Cornell University
 Michele S. Swanson, University of Michigan Medical School
 Roland M. Tisch, University of North Carolina, Chapel Hill
 Sharon L. Walsh, Johns Hopkins Bayview Medical Center
 David A. Wassarman, National Institute of Child Health and Development

National Science Foundation
 Jill Bargonetti, Hunter College of City University of New York
 Peter N. Belhumeur, Yale University
 Geoffrey E. Hill, Auburn University
 Daniel P. Lathrop, Emory University
 Jon P. Longtin, State University of New York at Stony Brook
 Timothy A. McKay, University of Michigan
 Ann M. Sastry, University of Michigan
 Steven W. McLaughlin, Georgia Institute of Technology
 Renée J. Miller, Ohio State University
 David P. Morton, University of Texas at Austin
 Linda K. Nozick, Cornell University
 Kate Okikiolu, University of California at San Diego
 Lori A. Setton, Duke University
 Jaswinder P. Singh, Princeton University
 Eileen M. Spain, Occidental College
 Florence I. Thomas, Dauphin Island Sea Lab
 Lonny L. Thompson, Clemson University
 Daniel W. van der Weide, University of Delaware
 Patricia A. Van Zandt, Johns Hopkins University
 Miguel Velez-Reyes, University of Puerto Rico - Mayaguez

1998
On February 10, 1999, President Bill Clinton announced the recipients of the PECASE for 1998:

Department of Agriculture
 John Dobrinsky, USDA Beltsville Agricultural Research Service
 Krishna Niyogi, University of California at Berkeley
 Brian J. Palik, Forest Service North Central Forest Experiment Station

Department of Commerce
 Michael H. Bergin, University of Colorado Institute for Research in Environmental Sciences, NOAA (now Georgia Tech)
 Sharon C. Glotzer, Material Sciences and Engineering Laboratory, NIST
 Anthony J. Kearsley, Information Technology Laboratory, NIST
 Joseph A. Shaw, Environmental Technology Laboratory, NOAA (now Montana State University)

Department of Defense
 Daniel J. Blumenthal, University of California, Santa Barbara
 Elizabeth C. Dickey, University of Kentucky
 Miroslav Krstic, University of California, San Diego
 John D. O'Brien, University of Southern California
 Robert G. Parker, Ohio State University
 Guillermo Sapiro, University of Minnesota

Department of Energy
 Mari Lou Balmer, Pacific Northwest National Laboratory
 Tonya L. Kuhl, University of California at Santa Barbara
 James E. Lee, Oak Ridge National Laboratory
 Roya Maboudian, University of California at Berkeley
 Anthony Mezzacappa, Oak Ridge National Laboratory
 Christopher P. Palmer, New Mexico Institute of Mining and Technology
 Gary P. Wiederrecht, Argonne National Laboratory

Department of Veterans’ Affairs
 Alan E. Mast, VA Medical Center
 Richard N. Pierson, VA Medical Center

National Aeronautics and Space Administration
 Mitchell S. Albert, Longwood Medical Research Center
 Howard Pearlman, University of Southern California
 Shobita Satyapal, NASA Goddard Space Flight Center
 Azadeh Tabazadeh, NASA Ames Research Center
 Paul O. Wennberg, California Institute of Technology
 Andrew Westphal, Space Science Laboratory, University of California

National Institutes of Health, Department of Health and Human Services
 Angelika B. Amon, Whitehead Institute for Biomedical Research
 Marlene Behrmann, Carnegie Mellon University
 Mark E. Brezinski, Massachusetts General Hospital
 David D. Chang, University of California, Los Angeles
 Brian D. Dynlacht, Harvard University
 Ulrike A. Heberlein, San Francisco General Hospital
 Linda A. Hicke, Northwestern University
 Effie W. Petersdorf, Fred Hutchinson Cancer Research Center
 Gregory J. Quirk, Urb. Punto Oro
 Jeffrey Struewing, National Cancer Institute, NIH
 Mark Von Zastrow, University of California
 Matthew Waldor, New England Medical Center

National Science Foundation
 Mario Affatigato, Coe College
 Eric I. Altman, Yale University
 Nalini Ambady, Harvard University
 Alexander Barvinok, University of Michigan
 Pei Cao, University of Wisconsin–Madison
 Janet Conrad, Columbia University
 Christopher J. Diorio, University of Washington
 Shirley J. Dyke, Washington University
 Rhonda F. Drayton, University of Illinois, Chicago
 Cassandra L. Fraser, University of Virginia
 Julie A. Jacko, University of Wisconsin–Madison
 Robert B. Jackson, University of Texas Austin
 Sugih Jamin, University of Michigan
 Elizabeth Lada, University of Florida
 Gregory H. Leazer, University of California, Los Angeles
 Gina M. MacDonald, James Madison University
 Scot Martin, University of North Carolina, Chapel Hill
 Hudson K. Reeve, Cornell University
 Venugopal Veeravalli, Cornell University
 Daniel Walczyk, Rensselaer Polytechnic Institute

1999

On April 11, 2000, President Bill Clinton announced the recipients of the PECASE for 1999:

Department of Agriculture
 Ann M. Donoghue, Livestock and Poultry Sciences Institute (Beltsville, Maryland)
 Emile S. Gardiner, U.S. Forest Service Southern Research Station
 Smita Mohanty, State University of New York at Stony Brook

Department of Commerce
 Pamela M. Chu, National Institute of Standards and Technology
 John G. W. Kelley, NOAA/National Ocean Service
 Nathan J. Mantua, University of Washington
 Eric L. Shirley, National Institute of Standards and Technology

Department of Defense
 Jeffrey Todd Borggaard, Virginia Polytechnic Institute and State University
 Gert Cauwenberghs, Johns Hopkins University
 Aaron W. Harper, Texas A&M University
 Daphne Koller, Stanford University
 Kathryn Moler, Stanford University
 Kimberly M. Wasserman, University of Michigan

Department of Energy
 Xian Chen, Los Alamos National Laboratory
 Ken R. Czerwinski, Los Alamos National Laboratory
 David M. Ford, Sandia National Laboratories
 Kenneth M. Kemner, Argonne National Laboratory
 John F. Mitchell, Argonne National Laboratory
 Lynne E. Parker, Oak Ridge National Laboratory

Department of Veterans Affairs
 Mary C. Nakamura, Department of Veterans Affairs Medical Center, San Francisco
 Peter A. Ubel, Department of Veterans Affairs Medical Center, Philadelphia

National Aeronautics and Space Administration
 Waleed Abdalati, Goddard Space Flight Center
 Gregory P. Asner, University of Colorado
 Michael Loewenberg, Yale University School of Medicine
 Fiona Anne Harrison, California Institute of Technology
 Preete Verghese, Smith Kettewell Eye Research Institute, San Francisco

National Institutes of Health
 Linda Barlow, University of Denver
 Annelise Barron, Northwestern University
 Carolyn Bertozzi, University of California, Berkeley
 Janean Holden, University of Illinois, Chicago
 Judith James, Oklahoma Medical Research Foundation
 Celia Moens, Fred Hutchinson Cancer Research Center
 Marina Picciotto, Yale University School of Medicine
 David Russel, University of Washington
 Geraldine Seydoux, Johns Hopkins School of Medicine
 Ida Sim, University of California, San Francisco
 Ronald Summers, Clinical Center, NIH
 Weidong Wang, National Institute on Aging, NIH
 Xiaoqin Wang, Johns Hopkins School of Medicine

National Science Foundation
 Linnea M. Avallone, University of Colorado Boulder
 John Chapin, Massachusetts Institute of Technology
 Donald DeVoe, University of Maryland, College Park
 Brenda L. Dingus, University of Wisconsin–Madison
 Dennis E. Discher, University of Pennsylvania
 Richard J. Elston, University of Florida
 Steven C. George, University of California, Irvine
 Lori L. Graham, University of Virginia
 Victoria L. Interrante, University of Minnesota, Twin Cities
 Predrag Jelekovic, Columbia University
 Yishi Jin, University of California, Santa Cruz
 Felicia Keesing, Siena College
 Steven D. Levitt, University of Chicago
 Todd L. Lowary, Ohio State University 
 Ken Ono, Pennsylvania State University, University Park
 Feniosky Pena-Mora, Massachusetts Institute of Technology
 Sanjay Raman, Virginia Polytechnic Institute and State University
 Richard W. Roberts, California Institute of Technology
 Jeffrey S. Urbach, Georgetown University
 Zhuomin Zhang, University of Florida

2000

On October 24, 2000, President Bill Clinton announced the recipients of the PECASE for 2000:

Department of Agriculture

 Randall S. Singer, University of Illinois
 Cindy D. Davis, USDA, Agricultural Research Service

Department of Commerce

 Mark William Keller, National Institute of Standards and Technology
 Deborah Shiu-Lan Jin, National Institute of Standards and Technology
 Robert Paul Dziak, National Oceanic and Atmospheric Administration, PacificMarine Environmental Laboratory
 Shawn Marie McLaughlin, National Oceanic and Atmospheric Administration, National Ocean Service

Department of Defense

 John Gregory Morrisett, Cornell University
 SonBinh T. Nguyen, Northwestern University
 Angela M. Belcher, University of Texas at Austin
 Barbara Spang Minsker, University of Illinois
 Carol A. Clayson, Purdue University
 Naoki Saito, University of California, Davis

Department of Energy

 Richard B. Lehoucq, Sandia National Laboratories
 Zhihong Lin, Princeton Plasma Physics Laboratory
 Zheng-Tian Lu, Argonne National Laboratory
 Aaron L. Odom, Los Alamos National Laboratory
 Jonas C. Peters, Los Alamos National Laboratory
 Andrey Zheludev, Brookhaven National Laboratory

Department of Veterans Affairs

 Eric J. Huang, San Francisco VA Medical Center
 Margot S. Damaser, Hines VA Medical Center

National Aeronautics and Space Administration

 Michael E. Brown, California Institute of Technology
 Dana Warfield Longcope, Montana State University
 Michael J. Turmon, NASA Jet Propulsion Laboratory
 Janice M. Yelle, NASA Johnson Space Center
 Paul Houser, NASA Goddard Space Flight Center
 Yeqiao Wang, University of Rhode Island

National Institutes of Health

 Philip Ashton-Rickardt, University of Chicago
 S. Barak Caine, Harvard Medical School, McLean Hospital
 Geoffrey A. Chang, Scripps Research Institute
 Christopher S. Chen, Johns Hopkins University
 Orna Cohen-Fix, NIDDK, National Institutes of Health
 Jeffrey S. Diamond, NINDS, National Institutes of Health
 Michael L. Dustin, Washington University School of Medicine
 Karl Kandler, University of Pittsburgh
 Monica Kraft, National Jewish Medical and Research Center
 Charles E. Murry, University of Washington
 Leslie S. Ritter, University of Arizona at Tucson
 Henrique von Gersdorff, Oregon Health Sciences University

National Science Foundation

 Sara C. Billey, Massachusetts Institute of Technology
 Reinhold Blumel, Wesleyan University
 Wilfredo Colón, Rensselaer Polytechnic Institute
 John N. DuPont, Lehigh University
 Carl T. Friedrichs, College of William and Mary
 Theresa Gaasterland, Rockefeller University
 Susan C. Hagness, University of Wisconsin-Madison
 Youssef Hashash, University of Illinois, Urbana Champaign
 Scott M. Husson, Clemson University
 Edwin C. Kan, Cornell University
 John David Kubiatowicz, University of California, Berkeley
 Alon Y. Levy, University of Washington
 Garrick E. Louis, University of Virginia
 Kwan-Liu Ma, University of California-Davis
 David L. Patrick, Western Washington University
 Georgia Perakis, Massachusetts Institute of Technology
 Anne S. Robinson, University of Delaware
 Jenny R. Saffran, University of Wisconsin-Madison
 Arthur R. Smith, Ohio University
 Kim Venn, Macalester College

2001 

On June 26, 2002, President George W. Bush announced the PECASE recipients for 2001:<ref
name="GWB200206"></ref>

Department of Defense

 Douglas Edward Adams, Purdue University
 Raffaello D'Andrea, Cornell University
 Ronald Paul Fedkiw, Stanford University
 Scott Robert Manalis, Massachusetts Institute of Technology
 Jeffrey Dean Niemann, Pennsylvania State University
 Peter Alexander Traykovski, Woods Hole Oceanographic Institution

Department of Agriculture

 Morgan Grove, Forest Service, Burlington, Vermont
 Daniel Strawn, University of Idaho
 David L. Suarez, Agricultural Research Service, Athens, Georgia

Department of Commerce

 Steven S. Brown, NOAA Aeronomy Laboratory and the Cooperative Institute for Research in Environmental Sciences, Boulder, Colorado
 John M. Butler, National Institute of Standards and Technology
 Thomas M. Hamill, NOAA Climate Diagnostics Center and the Cooperative Institute for Research in Environmental Sciences, Boulder, Colorado
 Eric K. Lin, National Institute of Standards and Technology

Department of Health and Human Services: National Institutes of Health

 Andrew E. Arai, National Institutes of Health
 Kelly N. Botteron, Washington University School of Medicine
 Regina M. Carelli, University of North Carolina, Chapel Hill
 Marshall S. Horwitz, University of Washington Medical School
 Jack J. Jiang, University of Wisconsin
 John A. Klingensmith, Duke University
 Michael P. Rout, The Rockefeller University
 William R. Schafer, University of California, San Diego
 Melissa J. Spencer, University of California, Los Angeles
 William Martin Usrey, University of California, Davis
 Leslie B. Vosshall, The Rockefeller University
 David Wotton, University of Virginia School of Medicine

Department of Energy

 Ian M. Anderson, Oak Ridge National Laboratory
 T. Vince Cianciolo, Oak Ridge National Laboratory
 Kenneth A. Gall, University of Colorado at Boulder
 Mark C. Herrmann, Lawrence Livermore National Laboratory
 Paul M. Ricker, University of Chicago
 Z. John Zhang, Georgia Institute of Technology
 Jizhong Zhou, Oak Ridge National Laboratory

Department of Veterans Affairs

 Jeffrey R. Smith, VA Medical Center, Nashville, Tennessee
 James A. Tulsky, VA Health Services Research and Development Service Center of Excellence in Durham, North Carolina

National Aeronautics and Space Administration

 James J. Bock, NASA Jet Propulsion Laboratory
 Stephane Coutu, Pennsylvania State University
 James H. Crawford, NASA Langley Research Center
 William Mell, University of Utah
 Mark A. Moline, California Polytechnic State University
 Cheryl A. Nickerson, Tulane University Health Sciences Center

National Science Foundation

 Philip John Bart, Louisiana State University
 Karen Jane Burg, Clemson University
 Brian David Conrad, University of Michigan
 Steven Andrew Cummer, Duke University
 Elizabeth Anna Davis, University of Michigan
 Reginald DesRoches, Georgia Institute of Technology
 Douglas John Emlen, University of Montana
 Michael C. Fitzgerald, Duke University
 Charles Forbes Gammie, University of Illinois at Urbana–Champaign
 Javier Garcia-Frias, University of Delaware
 Richard Brent Gillespie, University of Michigan
 Satyandra Kumar Gupta, University of Maryland, College Park
 C. Allan Guymon, University of Southern Mississippi
 Sheena Sethi Iyengar, Columbia University
 Veena Misra, North Carolina State University
 Christine Ortiz, Massachusetts Institute of Technology
 Mona Singh, Princeton University
 Linda K. Weavers, Ohio State University
 Erik Winfree, California Institute of Technology
 Jorge Gabriel Zornberg, University of Colorado Boulder

2002
2002 honorees:

Department of Agriculture
 Tara H. McHugh, Western Regional Research Center
 Mahfuzur Sarker, Oregon State University
 Therese M. Poland, Forest Service North Central Research Station

Department of Commerce
 Andrew W. Bruckner, National Oceanic and Atmospheric Administration
 Gabriel A. Vecchi, National Oceanic and Atmospheric Administration
 Jun Ye, National Institute of Standards and Technology
 Sae Woo Nam, National Institute of Standards and Technology

Department of Defense
 David Goldhaber-Gordon, Stanford University
 Hari C. Manoharan, Stanford University
 Michelle L. Pantoya, Texas Tech University
 Bridget Rogers, Vanderbilt University
 Venkatesh R. Saligrama, Boston University
 Gregory Neil Tew, University of Massachusetts

Department of Energy
 Jeffrey C. Blackmon, Oak Ridge National Laboratory
 Edmond Chow, Lawrence Livermore National Laboratory
 Sergei Maslov, Brookhaven National Laboratory
 Jonathan E. Menard, Princeton Plasma Physics Laboratory
 Christine Orme, Lawrence Livermore National Laboratory
 Krishnakumar Garikipati, University of Michigan
 Carl Boehlert, Alfred University

Department of Health and Human Services: National Institutes of Health
 Dana Boatman, Johns Hopkins University
 Susan K. Buchanan, National Institute of Diabetes and Digestive and Kidney Diseases
 William Carlezon, Harvard Medical School
 David Cummings, School of Medicine, University of California, San Francisco
 Kirk Deitsch, Weill Medical College, Cornell University
 Abby Dernburg, Lawrence Berkeley National Laboratory
 Marilyn Diaz, National Institute of Environmental Health Sciences
 Catherine Drennan, Massachusetts Institute of Technology
 Andrew Griffin, National Institute on Deafness and other Communication Disorders
 Valery I. Shestapalov, University of Miami School of Medicine
 Richard Walker, Oregon Health and Science University

Department of Veterans Affairs
 Gary E. Bryson, West Haven Veterans Affairs Medical Center
 Richard Z. Lin, State University of New York at Stony Brook

National Aeronautics and Space Administration
 J. Marshall Shepherd, Goddard Space Flight Center
 Mark Simons, California Institute of Technology
 Eric R. Weeks, Emory University
 Thomas Zurbuchen, University of Michigan

National Science Foundation
 Jennifer G. Becker, University of Maryland
 Squire J. Booker, Pennsylvania State University
 Susmita Bose, Washington State University
 Ian Dell'Antonio, Brown University
 J. Christian Gerdes, Stanford University
 Robert Ghrist, University of Illinois at Urbana-Champaign
 Amy Greenwald, Brown University
 Babak Hassibi, California Institute of Technology
 Jason M. Haugh, North Carolina State University
 Jionghua (Judy) Jin, University of Arizona
 Julia Kubanek, Georgia Institute of Technology
 Mark E. Lewis, University of Michigan
 Jia G. Lu, University of California at Irvine
 Thomas McDade, Northwestern University
 George J. Pappas, University of Pennsylvania
 N. Sanjay Rebello, Kansas State University
 Dan M. Stamper-Kurn, University of California at Berkeley
 Ion Stoica, University of California at Berkeley
 Brian M. Stoltz, California Institute of Technology
 John R. Wakeley, Harvard University

2003 
On September 9, 2004, President George W. Bush announced the honorees for 2003:

Department of Agriculture
 Timothy E. Link, University of Idaho
 Curtis P. Van Tassell, Agricultural Research Service
 Patrick A. Zollner, Forest Service North Central Research Station

Department of Commerce
 Sim D. Aberson, Atlantic Oceanographic and Meteorological Laboratory
 Scott A. Diddams, National Institute of Standards and Technology
 Jon R. Pratt, National Institute of Standards and Technology
 Kyle W. Shertzer, Southeast Fisheries Science Center

Department of Defense
 Brian P. Anderson, University of Arizona
 Vladimir Bulovic, Massachusetts Institute of Technology
 Rustem F. Ismagilov, University of Chicago
 Lyon B. King, Michigan Technological University
 Christopher Schuh, Massachusetts Institute of Technology
 Moe Z. Win, Massachusetts Institute of Technology

Department of Energy
 Tamara G. Kolda, Sandia National Laboratories
 Saskia Mioduszewski, Brookhaven National Laboratory
 Jian Shen, Oak Ridge National Laboratory
 Catherine M. Snelson, University of Nevada
 Margaret S. Torn, Lawrence Berkeley National Laboratory
 Donald P. Visco, Jr., Tennessee Technological University
 Brian D. Wirth, University of California, Berkeley

Department of Health and Human Services: National Institutes of Health
 Matthew I. Banks, University of Wisconsin-Madison
 Leonardo Belluscio, National Institute of Neurological Disorders and Stroke
 Linzhao Cheng, Johns Hopkins University
 William DeBello, University of California, Davis
 Michael B. Eisen, University of California, Berkeley
 Stuart Forman, Massachusetts General Hospital
 Peter D. Kwong, National Institute of Allergy and Infectious Diseases
 Anne M. Moon, University of Utah
 Sean J. Morrison, University of Michigan
 Steven D. Munger, University of Maryland School of Medicine
 Stephanie B. Seminara, Harvard Medical School
 Brian D. Strahl, University of North Carolina, Chapel Hill

Department of Veterans Affairs
 Steven M. Asch, Los Angeles Veterans Health Services
 Albert C. Lo, West Haven Veterans Administration

National Aeronautics and Space Administration
 Stuart D. Bale, University of California, Berkeley
 Carlos Del Castillo, Stennis Space Center
 Sarah Stewart-Mukhopadhyay, Harvard University

National Science Foundation
 Treena L. Arinzeh, New Jersey Institute of Technology
 Paola Barbara, Georgetown University
 Carla E. Cáceres, University of Illinois at Urbana-Champaign
 Harry J. Dankowicz, Virginia Polytechnic Institute and State University
 Daniel R. Gamelin, University of Washington
 Arjun M. Heimsath, Dartmouth College
 Joseph Henrich, Emory University
 Jennifer S. Lerner, Carnegie Mellon University
 Yoky Matsuoka, Carnegie Mellon University
 Roxana A. Moreno, University of New Mexico
 Kara L. Nelson, University of California, Berkeley
 Erica L. Plambeck, Stanford University
 Carla Mattos, North Carolina State University
 Juan G. Santiago, Stanford University
 Cyrus Shahabi, University of Southern California
 Sandeep K. Shukla, Virginia Polytechnic Institute and State University
 Kimmen Sjölander, University of California, Berkeley
 Elisabeth Smela, University of Maryland, College Park
 Konstantina Trivisa, University of Maryland, College Park
 Ravi D. Vakil, Stanford University

2004 

On June 13, 2005, President George W. Bush announced the awardees for 2004:

Department of Agriculture
Edward S. Buckler IV, Agricultural Research Service 
Devin G. Peterson, Pennsylvania State University 
Michael K. Schwartz, USDA Forest Service

Department of Commerce
Daniel J. Cziczo, National Oceanic and Atmospheric Administration 
Michael J. Fasolka, National Institute of Standards and Technology 
Philip Roni, National Oceanic and Atmospheric Administration
Joel N. Ullom, National Institute of Standards and Technology

Department of Defense
Ali Adibi, Georgia Institute of Technology 
Marija Drndic, University of Pennsylvania 
David S. Ginger, University of Washington 
John C. Howell, University of Rochester
Raadhakrishnan Poovendran, University of Washington
Mark J. Schnitzer, Stanford University

Department of Energy
John R. Arrington, Argonne National Laboratory 
William J. Ashmanskas, Fermi National Accelerator Laboratory 
Wei Cai, Stanford University
William P. King, Georgia Institute of Technology 
Yunfeng Lu, Tulane University 
Hong Qin, Princeton Plasma Physics Laboratory 
Robert B. Ross, Argonne National Laboratory 
Paul Vaska, Brookhaven National Laboratory 
Zhangbu Xu, Brookhaven National Laboratory

Department of Health and Human Services: National Institutes of Health
Luis R. Garcia, Texas A&M University 
Catherine M. Gordon, Boston Children's Hospital 
Joanna C. Jen, University of California, Los Angeles 
Yuhong Jiang, Harvard University
Neil Kelleher (scientist)Neil L. Kelleher, University of Illinois 
Tejvir S. Khurana, University of Pennsylvania
Robin F. Krimm, University of Louisville 
Suneeta Krishnan, University of California, San Francisco 
Kenneth D. Mandl, Children's Hospital of Boston 
Marisela Morales, National Institute on Drug Abuse
Teresa A. Nicolson, Oregon Health and Science University 
Brenda A. Schulman, St. Jude Children's Research Hospital

Department of Veterans Affairs
William M. Grady, University of Washington 
Kevin G. Volpp, University of Pennsylvania

National Aeronautics and Space Administration
David Alexander, Rice University 
Michael G. Bosilovich, National Aeronautics and Space Administration

National Science Foundation
David V. Anderson, Georgia Institute of Technology
Paul H. Barber, Boston University
Michael A. Bevan, Texas A&M University 
Derrick T. Brazill, City University of New York, Hunter College 
Frank L. H. Brown, University of California, Santa Barbara 
Marianella Casasola, Cornell University 
Elaine Chew, University of Southern California 
Martin L. Culpepper, Massachusetts Institute of Technology 
Oscar D. Dubon Jr., University of California, Berkeley 
Michael J. Garvin II, Columbia University
Sean Gavin, Wayne State University 
Jennifer A. Jay, University of California, Los Angeles 
Jun Jiao, Portland State University 
Shalinee Kishore, Lehigh University 
Wei Li, University of Washington
Donna L. Maney, Emory University
Daniel J. Mindiola, Indiana University 
Becky W. Packard, Mount Holyoke College 
Russell S. Schwartz, Carnegie Mellon University
Chengxiang Zhai, University of Illinois, Urbana-Champaign

2005 
2005 honorees:

Department of Agriculture
 Christopher John Fettig, USDA Forest Service
 Joseph Martin Jez, USDA Donald Danforth Plant Science Center 
 David Brian Johnston, USDA Agricultural Research Service

Department of Commerce
 Arlene Fiore Field, National Oceanic and Atmospheric Administration
 Katherine Ann Lefebvre, National Oceanic and Atmospheric Administration
 James Vincent Porto III, National Institute of Standards and Technology
 Christopher Lloyd Soles, National Institute of Standards and Technology

Department of Education
 Laura M. Justice, University of Virginia

Department of Energy
 Daniel Wayne Bardayan, Oak Ridge National Laboratory 
 Todd Munson, Argonne National Laboratory 
 Christopher John Roy, Auburn University 
 Wynne Katherine Schiffer, Brookhaven National Laboratory 
 Wendelin Jane Wright, Stanford University 
 Yanwen Zhang, Pacific Northwest National Laboratory 
 Michael Anthony Zingale, University of California, Santa Cruz

Department of Defense
 Randy Alan Bartels, Colorado State University 
 Kelly Jo Benoit Bird, Oregon State University 
 Mark Christopher Hersam, Northwestern University 
 Jennifer Eve Hoffman, Harvard University 
 Ju Li, Ohio State University
 Kenneth Martin O'Hara, Pennsylvania State University

Department of Health and Human Services: National Institutes of Health
 Sohyun Ahn, National Institutes of Health 
 Daniel Howard Appella, National Institutes of Health
 Karl Alexander Deisseroth, Stanford University
 Kathryn Pitkin Derose, RAND Corporation 
 Carolyn Debra Michelle Furr Holden, Pacific Institute for Research and Evaluation 
 Nace Leon Golding, University of Texas, Austin 
 Isabel Beatriz Luna Herrera, University of Pittsburgh
 Tannishtha Reya, Duke University
 Karissa Sanbonmatsu, Los Alamos National Laboratory
 Melanie Sarah Sanford, University of Michigan 
 Yihua (Bruce) Yu, University of Utah 
 Neal Scott Silverman, University of Massachusetts

National Aeronautics and Space Administration
 Jianli Chen, University of Texas, Austin

National Science Foundation
 Marina Umaschi Bers, Tufts University 
 Eugene Joseph Billiot, Texas A&M University, Corpus Christi 
 Rachel Melissa Brewster, University of Maryland, Baltimore County 
 Silvia Ferrari, Duke University 
 Shelly Lyne Gable Nayak, University of California, Los Angeles 
 Julia Eve Hammer, University of Hawaii 
 Ashley Jean James, University of Minnesota, Twin Cities 
 Tracy Lanise Johnson, University of California, San Diego 
 Scott David Kelly, University of Illinois, Urbana-Champaign 
 Anna Kathryn Mapp, University of Michigan 
 Thomas Leonard Martin, Virginia Polytechnic Institute and State University 
 Jonathan Christopher Mattingly, Duke University 
 Benjamin John McCall, University of Illinois, Urbana-Champaign 
 Suzie Hwang Pun, University of Washington 
 Rebeca Bat-Sheba Rosengaus-Nurko, Northeastern University, Boston
 Aravinthan Daniel Thevapirian Samuel, Harvard University 
 William Edward Schuler, University of Minnesota, Twin Cities
 James Earl Smay, Oklahoma State University 
 Michael Steven Strano, University of Illinois, Urbana-Champaign 
 Meiling (Janet) Wang, University of Arizona, Tucson

Department of Veterans Affairs
 David Jonathan Casarett, University of Pennsylvania 
 Jennifer Louise Gooch, Emory University

2006 

Honorees for 2006:

Department of Agriculture
 Douglas D. Bannerman, USDA Agricultural Research Service
 Sarah D. Brooks, Texas A&M University
 Samuel A. Cushman, USDA Forest Service

Department of Commerce
 Casey Brown, Columbia University
 Mark Scheuerell, National Oceanic and Atmospheric Administration
 Joshua C. Bienfang, National Institute of Standards and Technology

Department of Defense
 Odest C. Jenkins, Brown University
 Kenneth C. Slatton, University of Florida
 Jonathan E. Spanier, Drexel University
 Jacob L. Roberts, Colorado State University
 Krystyn J. Van Vliet, Massachusetts Institute of Technology
 Jelena Vučković, Stanford University
 Jennifer Hoffman, Harvard University

Department of Education
 Carol McDonald Connor, Florida State University

Department of Energy
 Kyle Cranmer, Brookhaven National Laboratory
 Brian J. Kirby, Cornell University
 Jeffrey W. Kysar, Columbia University
 Julia Laskin, Pacific Northwest National Laboratory
 Ho Nyung Lee, Oak Ridge National Laboratory
 Shawn Newsam, University of California, Merced
 Carlos Pantano-Rubino, University of Illinois
 Len A. Pennacchio, Lawrence Berkeley National Laboratory

Department of Health and Human Services: National Institutes of Health
 Katrina Akassoglou, University of California, San Diego
 Jeanmarie Houghton, University of Massachusetts
 Jay R. Hove, University of Cincinnati
 Sven-Eric Jordt, Yale University
 Susan M. Kaech, Yale University
 Bruce D. McCandliss, Cornell University
 Alexandra C. McPherron, National Institutes of Health
 Gus R. Rosania, University of Michigan
 J. Peter Rubin, University of Pittsburgh
 Ravindra N. Singh *, Iowa State University
 Michelle P. Winn, Duke University
 Adam T. Woolley, Brigham Young University

Department of Veterans Affairs
 Sterling C. Johnson, William S. Middleton VA Hospital
 William S. Yancy, Jr., Durham VA Medical Center

National Aeronautics and Space Administration
 Olivier Guyon, Subaru Telescope
 Matthew Rodell, Goddard Space Flight Center

National Science Foundation
 Sonya Bahar, University of Missouri-St. Louis
 Bahar Biller, Carnegie-Mellon University
 Matthew J. Fouch, Arizona State University
 Eric C. Greene, Columbia University
 Pradeep R. Guduru, Brown University
 Jenefer Husman, Arizona State University
 Dean S. Karlan, Yale University
 Brian G. Keating, University of California, San Diego
 Kiran Kedlaya, Massachusetts Institute of Technology
 Edward Kohler, University of California, Los Angeles
 J. Nicholas Laneman, University of Notre Dame
 Chekesha M. Liddell, Cornell University
 Elliot Moore II, Georgia Institute of Technology
 Amy J. Pruden-Bagchi, Colorado State University
 Carlos Rinaldi, University of Puerto Rico, Mayaguez
 James P. Schmiedeler, Ohio State University
 Ahna Skop, University of Wisconsin
 Yi Tang, University of California, Los Angeles
 Joseph W. Thornton, University of Oregon, Eugene
 Lisa M. Zurk, Portland State University

2007 

Honorees for 2007:

Department of Agriculture
 Valerie T. Eviner, University of California, Davis - USDA, Cooperative State Research, Education, and Extension Service
 Wendell R. Haag, USDA, Forest Service
 Zhongli Pan, USDA, Agricultural Research Service

Department of Commerce
 Yi Ming, National Oceanic and Atmospheric Administration
 William H. Rippard, National Institute for Standards and Technology
 Raymond Simmonds, National Institute for Standards and Technology

Department of Defense
 Mung Chiang, Princeton University
 Stefano Curtarolo, Duke University
 Chad D. Fertig, University of Georgia
 Maya Gupta, University of Washington
 Brian A. Lail, Florida Institute of Technology
 Zhenqiang Ma, University of Wisconsin, Madison
 Ravi Ramamoorthi, Columbia University
 Purnima Ratilal, Northeastern University
 Tim Roughgarden, Stanford University
 Rachel A. Segalman, University of California, Berkeley
 Max Shtein, University of Michigan
 Enrique R. Vivoni, New Mexico Institute of Mining & Technology
 Krista S. Walton, Kansas State University
 Haiyan Wang, Texas A&M University
 Shengli Zhou, University of Connecticut

Department of Education
 Gregory A. Fabiano, University of Buffalo
 Nicole M. McNeil, University of Notre Dame

Department of Energy
 Mickey G. Chiu, Brookhaven National Laboratory
 Hooman Davoudiasl, Brookhaven National Laboratory
 Bert Debusschere, Sandia National Laboratories
 Jennifer S. Martinez, Los Alamos National Laboratory
 Wei Pan, Sandia National Laboratories
 Robin Santra, Argonne National Laboratory
 Yugang Sun, Argonne National Laboratory
 Jeanine Cook, New Mexico State University

Department of Health and Human Services:National Institutes of Health
 Daphne W. Bell, National Human Genome Research Center, National Institutes of Health
 Thomas A. Blanpied, University of Maryland, School of Medicine
 Kevin C. Eggan, Harvard University
 Raymond Habas, University of Medicine and Dentistry of New Jersey
 Amy Heimberger, University of Texas
 James C. Iatridis, University of Vermont
 Francis S. Lee, Cornell University
 Michael J. MacCoss, University of Washington
 Elliott H. Margulies, National Human Genome Research Institute, National Institutes of Health
 Suchitra Nelson, Case Western Reserve University
 Laura E. O'Dell, University of Texas, El Paso
 Li Zhang, University of Southern California, Los Angeles

Department of Veterans Affairs
 Mary Bethe Humphrey, Oklahoma City VA Medical Center

National Aeronautics and Space Administration
 Charles Kankelborg, Montana State University
 Anna M. Michalak, University of Michigan, Ann Arbor
 Merav Opher, George Mason University

National Science Foundation
 Monica Medina, University of California, Merced
 Michael Elowitz, California Institute of Technology
 Sonia Altizer, University of Georgia
 Subhasish Mitra, Stanford University
 Stergios Roumeliotis, University of Minnesota
 Sanjit Seshia, University of California, Berkeley
 Nick Feamster, Georgia Institute of Technology
 Jeremy Gray, Yale University
 Maura J. Borrego, Virginia Polytechnic Institute and State University
 Xi Chen, Columbia University
 Sanjay Lall, Stanford University
 Andre W. Marshall, University of Maryland, College Park
 Aaron M. Thomas, University of Idaho
 Joan L. Walker, Boston University
 Kim Cobb, Georgia Institute of Technology
 Michael Yu, Johns Hopkins University
 Alexander Gamburd, University of California, Santa Cruz
 Anastasia Volovich, Brown University
 Katrina Miranda, University of Arizona
 Paul Torrens, Arizona State University

2008 

Honorees for 2008:

Department of Agriculture
 David H. McNear Jr., University of Kentucky
 Dean E. Pearson, Rocky Mt. Res. Station
 Erica Spackman, Poultry Res. Lab/USDA

Department of Commerce
 Craig Brown, National Institute of Standards and Technology
 Michael C. Coniglio, National Severe Storms Laboratory
 Dana H. Hanselman, Auke Bay Laboratory
 Pamela L. Heinselman, National Severe Storms Laboratory
 Dean DeLongchamp, National Institute of Standards and Technology
 Till P. Rosenband, National Institute of Standards and Technology

Department of Defense
 David P. Arnold, University of Florida
 Seth R. Bank, University of Texas, Austin
 Christopher W. Bielawski, University of Texas, Austin
 Elizabeth Boon, Stony Brook University
 Markus J. Buehler, Massachusetts Institute of Technology
 Scott A. Craver, Binghamton University
 John O. Dabiri, California Institute of Technology
 Chris L. Dwyer, Duke University
 Gregory S. Engel, University of Chicago
 Thomas H. Epps III, University of Delaware
 Gregory A. Fiete, University of Texas, Austin
 Oliver Fringer, Stanford University
 Anthony Grbic, University of Michigan
 Carlos E. Guestrin, Carnegie Mellon University
 Michael A. Hickner, Penn State University
 Michael J. Hochberg, University of Washington
 Yu Huang, University of California, Los Angeles
 Gregory H. Huff, Texas A&M University
 Jacob L. Jones, University of Florida
 Sanjay Kumar, University of California, Berkeley
 Xiaoqin Li, University of Texas, Austin
 Mathew M. Maye, Syracuse University
 Leigh S. McCue-Weil, Virginia Polytechnic Institute and State University
 Beverley J. McKeon, California Institute of Technology
 Anastasia H. Muliana, Texas A&M University
 Ryan P. O'Hayre, Colorado School of Mines
 Jiwoong Park, Cornell University
 Susan E. Parks, Penn State University
 Jason R. Petta, Princeton University
 Justin K. Romberg, Georgia Institute of Technology
 Adrienne Stiff-Roberts, Duke University
 Benjamin R. tenOever, Mt. Sinai School of Medicine
 Joel Tropp, California Institute of Technology
 Derek H. Warner, Cornell University
 Sharon M. Weiss, Vanderbilt University
 Patrick J. Wolfe, Harvard University
 Robert J. Wood, Harvard University
 Tanya Zelevinsky, Columbia University
 Jianglong Zhang, University of North Dakota
 Xiaolin Zheng, Stanford University
 Rashid Zia, Brown University

Department of Education
 Nonie K. Lesaux, Harvard University
 Katherine A. Rawson, Kent State University

Department of Energy
 Cecilia R. Aragon, Lawrence Berkeley National Laboratory
 Gary A. Baker, Oak Ridge National Laboratory
 Joshua A. Breslau, Princeton Plasma Physics
 Gianluigi Ciovati, Thomas Jefferson Lab National Accelerator Facility
 Stefan P. Gerhardt, Princeton Plasma Physics
 Lynford L. Goddard, University of Illinois
 Jason Graetz, Brookhaven National Laboratory
 Jeffrey B. Neaton, Lawrence Berkeley National Laboratory
 Thao D. Nguyen, Johns Hopkins University
 Paul Sorensen, Brookhaven National Laboratory
 Alexandre M. Tartakovsky, Pacific Northwest National Laboratory
 Ivan Vitev, Los Alamos National Laboratory

Department of Veterans’ Affairs
 Melina R. Kibbe, Jesse Brown VA
 Alexander H. Sox-Harris, Palo Alto VA

National Aeronautics and Space Administration
 Benjamin E. Smith, University of Washington
 Joshua K. Willis, Jet Propulsion Laboratory

National Institutes of Health, Department of Health and Human Services
 Thomas P. Cappola, University of Pennsylvania
 Pablo A. Celnik, Johns Hopkins University
 Felicia D. Goodrum, University of Arizona
 Bruce J. Hinds III, University of Kentucky
 Helen H. Lu, Columbia University
 Ulrike Peters, Fred Hutchinson Cancer Center
 Jeremy F. Reiter, University of California, San Francisco
 Marisa Roberto, The Scripps Research Institute
 Erica O. Saphire, The Scripps Research Institute
 Oscar E. Suman, Shriner's Hospital, University of Texas
 Kristin V. Tarbell, The National Institute of Diabetes and Digestive and Kidney Diseases
 Gonzalo E. Torres, University of Pittsburgh

National Science Foundation
 Maria M. Calbi, Southern Illinois University, Carbondale
 Amy B. Cerato, University of Oklahoma
 Ioannis Chasiotis, University of Illinois
 Monica Cox, Purdue University
 Cameron R. Currie, University of Wisconsin
 Joel L. Dawson, Massachusetts Institute of Technology
 Jimmy de la Torre, Rutgers University
 Roland G. Fryer Jr., Harvard University
 Sean Hallgren, Penn State University
 John M. Herbert, Ohio State University
 Steven D. Jacobsen, Northwestern University
 Charles R. Keeton II, Rutgers University
 Chun Ning Lau, University of California, Riverside
 Hao Lin, Rutgers University
 Harmit S. Malik, Fred Hutchinson Cancer Center
 Rada F. Mihalcea, University of North Texas
 Scott R. Sheffield, Massachusetts Institute of Technology
 Zuzanna S. Siwy, University of California, Irvine
 Adam D. Smith, Penn State University
 Joy K. Ward, University of Kansas

2009 

Honorees for 2009:

Department of Agriculture
 Lee K. Cerveny, Forest Service
 Michael L. Looper, Agricultural Research Service
 Jeffrey S. Ross-Ibarra, University of California, Davis

Department of Commerce
 R. David Holbrook, Jr., National Institute of Standards and Technology
 Daniel S. Hussey, National Institute of Standards and Technology
 Ian B. Spielman, National Institute of Standards and Technology
 Matthew J. Menne, National Oceanic and Atmospheric Administration
 Charles A. Stock, National Oceanic and Atmospheric Administration
 J. Christopher Taylor, National Oceanic and Atmospheric Administration

Department of Defense
 Andrea M. Armani, University of Southern California
 Adam E. Cohen, Harvard University
 Eugenio Culurciello, Yale University
 Nathan C. Gianneschi, University of California, San Diego
 Ryan C. Hayward, University of Massachusetts, Amherst
 Andrew A. Houck, Princeton University
 Farinaz Koushanfar, Rice University
 Emilia Morosan, Rice University
 Abhay P. Narayan, Columbia University
 Matthew A. Oehlschlaeger, Rensselaer Polytechnic Institute
 Willie J. Padilla, Boston College
 Eric Pop, University of Illinois at Urbana-Champaign
 Michelle Povinelli, University of Southern California
 Emily A. Weiss, Northwestern University
 Martin W. Zwierlein, Massachusetts Institute of Technology

Department of Education
 Catherine P. Bradshaw, Johns Hopkins Bloomberg School of Public Health
 Jennifer G. Cromley, Temple University

Department of Energy
 Ilke Arslan, University of California, Davis
 Eric D. Bauer, Los Alamos National Laboratory
 Jeremy T. Busby, Oak Ridge National Laboratory
 Gavin E. Crooks, Lawrence Berkeley National Laboratory
 Juan Estrada, Fermi National Accelerator Laboratory
 Dillon D. Fong, Argonne National Laboratory
 Jacob M. Hooker, Brookhaven National Laboratory
 Gianluca Iaccarino, Stanford University
 De-en Jiang, Oak Ridge National Laboratory
 Sergei V. Kalinin, Oak Ridge National Laboratory
 Elena V. Shevchenko, Argonne National Laboratory
 Jacob G. Wacker, SLAC National Accelerator Laboratory

Department of the Interior
 Jeanne L. Hardebeck, U.S. Geological Survey
 Nicolas Luco, U.S. Geological Survey
 Pamela L. Nagler, U.S. Geological Survey

Department of Veterans Affairs
 Pamela J. VandeVord, Wayne State University
 Rachel M. Werner, Philadelphia VA Medical Center

National Aeronautics and Space Administration
 Matthew J. Oliver, University of Delaware
 Rahul Ramachandran, The University of Alabama in Huntsville

National Institutes of Health, Department of Health and Human Services
 Dominique C. Bergmann, Stanford University
 Edward A. Botchwey III, University of Virginia
 Brian P. Brooks, National Eye Institute, NIH
 Mauricio R. Delgado, Rutgers, The State University of New Jersey
 Amy N. Finkelstein, Massachusetts Institute of Technology
 Alfredo Fontanini, State University of New York, Stony Brook
 Manolis Kellis, Massachusetts Institute of Technology
 Jessica Y. Lee, University of North Carolina at Chapel Hill
 Bradley A. Malin, Vanderbilt University Medical Center
 Ana P. Martinez-Donate, University of Wisconsin-Madison
 Kimberly Nixon, University of Kentucky
 Caryn E. Outten, University of South Carolina
 Muneesh Tewari, Fred Hutchinson Cancer Research Center
 Doris Y. Tsao, California Institute of Technology
 Charles P. Venditti, National Human Genome Research Institute, NIH
 Amy J. Wagers, Joslin Diabetes Center
 Ziv Williams, Massachusetts General Hospital
 Joseph C. Wu, Stanford University School of Medicine
 Haoxing Xu, University of Michigan
 Martin T. Zanni, University of Wisconsin-Madison

National Science Foundation
 Scott J. Aaronson, Massachusetts Institute of Technology
 David M. Amodio, New York University
 Alexandre M. Bayen, University of California, Berkeley
 Rachel E. Bean, Cornell University
 Magdalena Bezanilla, University of Massachusetts, Amherst
 Jose H. Blanchet Mancilla, Columbia University
 Virginia A. Davis, Auburn University
 Jayne C. Garno, Louisiana State University
 Michael T. Laub, Massachusetts Institute of Technology
 Steven K. Lower, The Ohio State University
 Jerome P. Lynch, University of Michigan
 Malcolm A. MacIver, Northwestern University
 Shelie A. Miller, University of Michigan
 Reza Olfati-Saber, Dartmouth College
 Laura E. Schulz, Massachusetts Institute of Technology
 Joshua W. Shaevitz, Princeton University
 Ivan I. Smalyukh, University of Colorado at Boulder
 Edo Waks, University of Maryland, College Park
 Katrin Wehrheim, Massachusetts Institute of Technology

2010 

On September 26, 2011, President Obama honored the following scientists:

National Institutes of Health, Department of Health and Human Services
 Rommie E. Amaro, University of California, Irvine
 Sonja M. Best, National Institute of Allergy and Infectious Diseases
 David T. Breault, Children's Hospital Boston
 John Brownstein, Children's Hospital Boston
 Brian S. Caffo, Johns Hopkins University
 Nicola J. Camp, University of Utah
 Pierre R. Comizzoli, Smithsonian Institution
 Chyke A. Doubeni, University of Massachusetts Medical School
 Jose C. Florez, Massachusetts General Hospital and the Broad Institute
 James L. Gulley, National Cancer Institute
 W. Nicholas Haining, Harvard Medical School
 Thomas L. Kash, University of North Carolina School of Medicine
 John C. March, Cornell University
 Katherine L. O'Brien, Johns Hopkins Bloomberg School of Public Health
 Carla M. Pugh, Northwestern University Feinberg School of Medicine
 Jamie L. Renbarger, Indiana University
 Sara L. Sawyer, University of Texas at Austin
 Hari Shroff, National Institute of Biomedical Imaging and Bioengineering
 Mary Jo Trepka, Florida International University
 Linda E. Wilbrecht, University of California at San Francisco

Department of Agriculture
 Laura L. Bellows, Colorado State University
 Jonathan G. Lundgren, Agricultural Research Service
 Samuel L. Zelinka, U.S. Forest Service

Department of Commerce
 Jeffrey A. Fagan, National Institute of Standards and Technology
 James A. Morris Jr, National Oceanic and Atmospheric Administration
 Erin M. Oleson, National Oceanic and Atmospheric Administration
 David E. Richardson, National Oceanic and Atmospheric Administration
 Kartik A. Srinivasan, National Institute of Standards and Technology
 Jacob M. Taylor, National Institute of Standards and Technology

Department of Defense
 Michael S. Arnold, University of Wisconsin at Madison
 Jeffrey W. Book, Naval Research Laboratory
 Tad T. Brunye, U.S. Army Natick Soldier Research, Development and Engineering Center
 Dirk R. Englund, Columbia University
 Ali Khademhosseini, Harvard Medical School and Brigham and Women's Hospital
 Reuben H. Kraft, U.S. Army Research Laboratory
 Tonghun Lee, Michigan State University
 Anne J. McNeil, University of Michigan
 Aydogan Ozcan, University of California, Los Angeles
 Tomas A. Palacios, Massachusetts Institute of Technology
 Sumita Pennathur, University of California, Santa Barbara
 Kyle M. Shen, Cornell University
 Amit Singer, Princeton University
 Stephen M. Spottswood, U.S. Air Force Research Laboratory
 Joseph M. Teran, University of California, Los Angeles
 Lan Yang, Washington University in St. Louis

Department of Education
 Roy Levy, Arizona State University

Department of Energy
 Christian W. Bauer, Lawrence Berkeley National Laboratory
 Greg Bronevetsky, Lawrence Livermore National Laboratory
 Fotini Katopodes Chow, University of California, Berkeley
 Carole Dabney-Smith, Miami University
 David Erickson, Cornell University
 Daniel C. Fredrickson, University of Wisconsin—Madison
 Christiane Jablonowski, University of Michigan
 Gang Logan Liu, University of Illinois at Urbana-Champaign
 Alysia D. Marino, University of Colorado at Boulder
 Victoria Orphan, California Institute of Technology
 Wei-Jun Qian, Pacific Northwest National Laboratory
 Evgenya I. Simakov, Los Alamos National Laboratory
 Feng Wang, University of California, Berkeley

Department of the Interior
 Sasha C. Reed, U.S. Geological Survey
 David R. Shelly, U.S. Geological Survey

Department of Transportation
 Kristin C. Lewis, Volpe National Transportation Systems Center

Department of Veterans Affairs
 Tanya Z. Fischer, Veterans Health Administration
 Christine M. Freeman, Veterans Health Administration
 B. Price Kerfoot, Veterans Health Administration and Harvard Medical School
 DKristina M. Utzschneider, Veterans Health Administration and University of Washington

Environmental Protection Agency
 Gayle S.W. Hagler, National Risk Management Research Laboratory
 David M. Reif, National Center for Computational Toxicology

National Aeronautics and Space Administration
 Jonathan W. Cirtain, Marshall Space Flight Center
 Ian M. Howat, The Ohio State University
 Gregory G. Howes, University of Iowa
 Benjamin A. Mazin, University of California, Santa Barbara

National Science Foundation
 Katherine Aidala, Mount Holyoke College
 Hatice Altug, Boston University
 Salman A. Avestimehr, Cornell University
 Joshua C. Bongard, University of Vermont
 David J. Brumley, Carnegie Mellon University
 Elizabeth S. Cochran, U.S. Geological Survey
 Noah J. Cowan, Johns Hopkins University
 Xiangfeng Duan, University of California, Los Angeles
 Michael J. Escuti, North Carolina State University
 Demetra C. Evangelou, Purdue University
 Benjamin A. Garcia, Princeton University
 Tina A. Grotzer, Harvard Graduate School of Education
 Lasse Jensen, Pennsylvania State University
 Benjamin Kerr, University of Washington
 Benjamin L. Lev, Stanford University
 Elena G. Litchman, Michigan State University
 Yasamin Mostofi, University of New Mexico
 Lilianne R. Mujica-Parodi, State University of New York at Stony Brook
 Andre D. Taylor, Yale University
 Claudia R. Valeggia, University of Pennsylvania
 Maria G. Westdickenberg, Georgia Institute of Technology

Smithsonian Institution
 Justin C. Kasper, Smithsonian Astrophysical Observatory

2011 

On July 23, 2012, President Obama presented the following scientists with the award for 2011:

Department of Education
 Li Cai, University of California, Los Angeles

Department of Agriculture
 Joseph E. Jakes, U.S. Forest Service
 Ian Kaplan, Purdue University
 Christina L. Swaggerty, Agricultural Research Service

Department of Commerce
 Anthony Arguez, National Oceanic and Atmospheric Administration
 Ian Coddington, National Institute of Standards and Technology
 Frank W. DelRio, National Institute of Standards and Technology
 Jayne Billmayer Morrow, National Institute of Standards and Technology
 Kyle S. Van Houtan, National Oceanic and Atmospheric Administration
 Rebecca Washenfelder, National Oceanic and Atmospheric Administration

Department of Defense
 David M. Blei, Princeton University
 Ania Bleszynski Jayich, University of California, Santa Barbara
 Alejandro L. Briseno, University of Massachusetts, Amherst
 Lee R. Cambrea, Naval Air Research Intelligence
 Vincent Conitzer, Duke University
 Chiara Daraio, California Institute of Technology
 Craig J. Fennie, Cornell University
 Keith Edward Knipling, Naval Research Laboratory, Department of the Navy
 Wen Li, Wayne State University
 Timothy K. Lu, Massachusetts Institute of Technology
 Cindy Regal, University of Colorado Boulder
 Matthew B. Squires, Air Force Research Laboratory, Department of the Air Force
 Joseph E. Subotnik, University of Pennsylvania
 Ao Tang, Cornell University
 C. Shad Thaxton, Northwestern University
 Maria Laina Urso, U.S. Army Research Institute for Environmental Medicine

Department of Energy
 Stanley Atcitty, Sandia National Laboratories
 Jeffrey W. Banks, Lawrence Livermore National Laboratory
 Amy J. Clarke, Los Alamos National Laboratory
 Derek R. Gaston, Idaho National Laboratory
 Christopher Hirata, California Institute of Technology
 Heileen Hsu-Kim, Duke University
 Thomas Francisco Jaramillo, Stanford University
 Pablo Jarillo-Herrero, Massachusetts Institute of Technology
 John R. Kitchin, Carnegie Mellon University
 Peter Mueller, Argonne National Laboratory
 Daniel B. Sinars, Sandia National Laboratories
 Jesse Thaler, Massachusetts Institute of Technology
 Heather Whitley, Lawrence Livermore National Laboratory

Department of Health and Human Services
 Erez Lieberman Aiden, Harvard University
 Nihal Altan-Bonnet, Rutgers University
 Peter D. Crompton, National Institute of Allergy and Infectious Diseases
 Margherita R. Fontana, University of Michigan School of Dentistry
 Ervin Ray Fox, University of Mississippi Medical Center
 Valerie Horsley, Yale University
 Steven T. Kosak, Northwestern University Feinberg School of Medicine
 Erica N. Larschan, Brown University
 Daniel R. Larson, National Cancer Institute
 Krista M. Lisdahl, University of Wisconsin – Milwaukee
 Emanual Maverakis, University of California, Davis
 Biju Parekkadan, Massachusetts General Hospital and Harvard Medical School
 Jay Zachary Parrish, University of Washington
 Peter Philip Reese, University of Pennsylvania
 Niels Ringstad, Skirball Institute, New York University School of Medicine
 Pawan Sinha, Massachusetts Institute of Technology
 Georgios Skiniotis, University of Michigan
 Beth Stevens, F.M. Kirby Neurobiology Center, Boston Children's Hospital
 Justin Taraska, National Heart, Lung, and Blood Institute
 Jennifer Rabke Verani, National Center for Immunization and Respiratory Diseases
 Brendan M. Walker, Washington State University
 Lauren Bailey Zapata, National Center for Chronic Disease Prevention and Health Promotion

Department of the Interior
 Joseph P. Colgan, U.S. Geological Survey
 Karen R. Felzer, U.S. Geological Survey
 Justin J. Hagerty, U.S. Geological Survey

Department of Veterans Affairs
 Jeffrey R. Capadona, Louis Stokes Cleveland Veteran Affairs Medical Center
 Charlesnika T. Evans, Edward Hines Jr. Veterans Affairs Hospital
 Amy M. Kilbourne, Veterans Affairs Ann Arbor Healthcare System
 Kinh Luan Phan, Jesse Brown Veterans Affairs Medical Center

Environmental Protection Agency
 Adam P. Eisele, U.S. Environmental Protection Agency
 Mehdi Saeed Hazari, U.S. Environmental Protection Agency

National Aeronautics and Space Administration
 Morgan B. Abney, Marshall Space Flight Center
 Ian Gauld Clark, Jet Propulsion Laboratory and California Institute of Technology
 Temilola Fatoyinbo-Agueh, Goddard Space Flight Center
 Jessica E. Koehne, Ames Research Center
 Francis M. McCubbin, Institute of Meteoritics, University of New Mexico
 Yuri Y. Shprits, University of California, Los Angeles

National Science Foundation
 Baratunde Aole Cola, Georgia Institute of Technology
 Brady R. Cox, University of Arkansas
 Meghan A. Duffy, Georgia Institute of Technology
 Joshua S. Figueroa, University of California, San Diego
 Michael J. Freedman, Princeton University
 Erin Marie Furtak, University of Colorado Boulder
 B. Scott Gaudi, The Ohio State University
 Curtis Huttenhower, Harvard University
 Christopher A. Mattson, Brigham Young University
 David C. Noone, University of Colorado Boulder
 Parag A. Pathak, Massachusetts Institute of Technology
 Alice Louise Pawley, Purdue University
 Amy Lucía Prieto, Colorado State University
 Mayly C. Sanchez, Iowa State University and Argonne National Laboratory
 Sridevi Vedula Sarma, Johns Hopkins University
 Suzanne M. Shontz, Pennsylvania State University
 Mariel Vázquez, San Francisco State University
 Luis von Ahn, Carnegie Mellon University
 Brent Waters, University of Texas, Austin
 Jennifer Wortman Vaughan, University of California, Los Angeles
 Salman A. Avestimehr, University of Southern California

2012 

On December 23, 2013, President Obama presented the following scientists with the award for 2012:

Department of Agriculture
 Steven Cannon, Iowa State University
 Isis Mullarky, Virginia Polytechnic Institute and State University
 Justin Runyon, U.S. Forest Service

Department of Commerce
 Gretchen Campbell, National Institute of Standards and Technology
 Adam Clark, University of Oklahoma / NOAA National Severe Storms Laboratory
 Alan Haynie, National Oceanic and Atmospheric Administration
 R. Joseph Kline, National Institute of Standards and Technology
 Ana Rey, National Institute of Standards and Technology and University of Colorado at Boulder
 Scott Weaver, National Oceanic and Atmospheric Administration

Department of Defense
 Jennifer Dionne, Stanford University
 Mohamed El-Naggar, University of Southern California
 Gregory Fuchs, Cornell University
 Kristen Grauman, University of Texas at Austin
 Mona Jarrahi, University of Michigan at Ann Arbor
 Lane Martin, University of Illinois at Urbana-Champaign
 Yael Niv, Princeton University
 Derek Paley, University of Maryland
 Greg Pitz, Air Force Research Laboratory
 Ronald Polcawich, U.S. Army Research Laboratory
 Rodney Priestley, Princeton University
 Jeremy Robinson, Naval Research Laboratory
 Onome Scott-Emuakpor, Air Force Research Laboratory
 Ramon van Handel, Princeton University
 David Weld, University of California at Santa Barbara
 Yongjie Zhang, Carnegie Mellon University

Department of Education
 Jeffrey Karpicke, Purdue University 
 Young-Suk Kim, Florida State University

Department of Energy
 Brian Anderson, West Virginia University
 Theodore Betley, Harvard University
 Matthew Brake, Sandia National Laboratories
 Adrian Chavez, Sandia National Laboratories
 Gary Douberly, University of Georgia
 Mattan Erez, University of Texas at Austin
 Sean Hartnoll, Stanford University
 Daniel Kasen, University of California at Berkeley and Lawrence Berkeley National Laboratory
 Meimei Li, Argonne National Laboratory
 Miguel Morales, Lawrence Livermore National Laboratory
 Jennifer Reed, University of Wisconsin at Madison
 Seth Root, Sandia National Laboratories
 Adam Weber, Lawrence Berkeley National Laboratory

Department of Health and Human Services
 Debra Auguste, City College of New York
 Jessica Belser, Centers for Disease Control and Prevention
 Jeremy Clark, University of Washington
 Andreea Creanga, Centers for Disease Control and Prevention
 Damien Fair, Oregon Health and Science University
 Thomas Fazzio, University of Massachusetts Medical School
 Jessica Gill, National Institutes of Health
 Andrew Goodman, Yale University School of Medicine
 Aron Hall, Centers for Disease Control and Prevention
 Xue Han, Boston University
 Susan Harbison, National Institutes of Health
 Richard Ho, Vanderbilt University Medical Center
 Shingo Kajimura, University of California at San Francisco
 Young-Shin Kim, Yale University School of Medicine
 Todd Macfarlan, National Institutes of Health
 Gaby Maimon, Rockefeller University
 Sandra McAllister, Harvard Medical School
 Quyen Nguyen, University of California at San Diego
 Sallie Permar, Duke University School of Medicine
 Katherine Radek, Loyola University Chicago
 Katherine Rauen, University of California at San Francisco
 Ida Spruill, Medical University of South Carolina
 Andrew Yoo, Washington University School of Medicine

Department of the Interior
 Anna Chalfoun, U.S. Geological Survey
 Gavin Hayes, U.S. Geological Survey
 Burke Minsley, U.S. Geological Survey

Department of Veterans Affairs
 Karunesh Ganguly, San Francisco VA Medical Center
 Brian Head, VA San Diego Healthcare System
 Katherine Iverson, VA Boston Healthcare System
 Hardeep Singh, Houston VA Medical Center

Environmental Protection Agency
 Steven Thomas Purucker, Environmental Protection Agency

Intelligence Community
 Joeanna Arthur, National Geospatial-Intelligence Agency
 Lucy Cohan, Central Intelligence Agency
 Justin Jacobs, National Security Agency
 Steven Jaslar, Federal Bureau of Investigation
 Daniel Stick, Sandia National Laboratories
 Charles Tahan, National Security Agency

National Aeronautics and Space Administration
 Joshua Alwood, NASA Ames Research Center
 Douglas Hoffmann, Jet Propulsion Laboratory and California Institute of Technology
 Randall McEntaffer, University of Iowa
 Tamlin Pavelsky, University of North Carolina
 Patrick Taylor, NASA Langley Research Center

National Science Foundation
 Theodor Agapie, California Institute of Technology
 Javier Arce-Nazario, University of Puerto Rico at Cayey
 Sarah Bergbreiter, University of Maryland at College Park
 Moises Carreon, University of Louisville
 Sigrid Close, Stanford University
 Raffaella De Vita, Virginia Polytechnic Institute and State University
 Abigail Doyle, Princeton University
 Daniel Goldman, Georgia Institute of Technology
 Joel Griffitts, Brigham Young University
 Samantha Hansen, University of Alabama
 Rouslan Krechetnikov, University of California at Santa Barbara
 Tamara Moore, University of Minnesota
 Daniela Oliveira, Bowdoin College
 Jonathan Pillow, University of Texas at Austin
 Benjamin Recht, University of Wisconsin at Madison
 David Savitt, University of Arizona
 Noah Snavely, Cornell University
 Junqiao Wu, University of California at Berkeley
 Ahmet Yildiz, University of California at Berkeley

Smithsonian Institution
 Rossman Irwin III, National Air and Space Museum

2013 

On February 18, 2016, President Obama presented 105 researchers with the award for 2013:

Department of Agriculture
Renee Arias, National Peanut Research Laboratory
Matthew Thompson, Rocky Mountain Research Station
Kenong Xu, Cornell University

Department of Commerce
Nathan Bacheler, National Oceanic and Atmospheric Administration
Adam Creuziger, National Institute of Standards and Technology
Gijs de Boer, National Oceanic and Atmospheric Administration and University of Colorado-Boulder
Tara Lovestead, National Institute of Standards and Technology
Andrew Ludlow, National Institute of Standards and Technology
James Thorson, National Oceanic and Atmospheric Administration

Department of Defense
Pieter Abbeel, University of California-Berkeley
Deji Akinwande, University of Texas-Austin
Jin-Hee Cho, US Army Research Laboratory
Sarah Cowie, University of Nevada-Reno
Dino Di Carlo, University of California-Los Angeles
Alon Gorodetsky, University of California-Irvine
Elad Harel, Northwestern University
Patrick Hopkins, University of Virginia
Anya Jones, University of Maryland
Colin Joye, Naval Research Laboratory
Lena Kourkoutis, Cornell University
Jennifer Miksis-Olds, Pennsylvania State University
Timothy Ombrello, Air Force Research Laboratory
Heather Pidcoke, US Army Institute of Surgical Research
James Rondinelli, Drexel University
Bozhi Tian, University of Chicago
Luke Zettlemoyer, University of Washington

Department of Education
Christopher Lemons, Peabody College of Vanderbilt University
Cynthia Puranik, University of Pittsburgh

Department of Energy
Tonio Buonassisi, Massachusetts Institute of Technology
Milind Kulkarni, Purdue University
Keji Lai, University of Texas-Austin
Paul Ohodnicki, Jr., National Energy Technology Laboratory
Michelle O'Malley, University of California, Santa Barbara
Matthias Schindler, University of South Carolina
Jonathan Simon, University of Chicago
Michael Stadler, Lawrence Berkeley National Laboratory
Melissa Teague, Idaho National Laboratory
William Tisdale, Massachusetts Institute of Technology
Jonathan Hopkins, University of California, Los Angeles
Tammy Ma, Lawrence Livermore National Laboratory
David Mascareñas, Los Alamos National Laboratory

Department of Health and Human Services
Hillel Adesnik, University of California, Berkeley
Cheryl Broussard, Centers for Disease Control and Prevention
Samantha Brugmann, Cincinnati Children's Hospital Medical Center
Namandje Bumpus, Johns Hopkins University
Jacob Carr, Centers for Disease Control and Prevention
Kafui Dzirasa, Duke University
Camilla Forsberg, University of California, Santa Cruz
Tina Goldstein, University of Pittsburgh
Viviana Gradinaru, California Institute of Technology
Jordan Green, Johns Hopkins University
Katie Kindt, National Institutes of Health
Andre Larochelle, National Institutes of Health
Jennifer Lorvick, RTI International
Courtney Miller, The Scripps Research Institute
Kiran Musunuru, Harvard University
David Pagliarini, University of Wisconsin – Madison
Sachin Patel, Vanderbilt University
Amy Ralston, University of California Santa Cruz
Carrie Reed, Centers for Disease Control and Prevention
Ervin Sejdic, University of Pittsburgh
Elizabeth Skidmore, University of Pittsburgh
Kay Tye, Massachusetts Institute of Technology
Muhammad Walji, The University of Texas School of Dentistry at Houston

Department of Interior
Richard Briggs, U.S. Geological Survey
Jeffrey Pigati, U.S. Geological Survey
Maureen Purcell, U.S. Geological Survey

Department of Veterans Affairs
Paul Marasco, Louis Stokes Cleveland VA Medical Center
Panagiotis Roussos, James J. Peters VA Medical Center
Erika Wolf, VA Boston Healthcare System

Environmental Protection Agency
Rebecca Dodder, EPA
Alex Marten, EPA

Intelligence Community
Kregg Arms, National Security Agency
Nicole Bohannon, Central Intelligence Agency
Ashley Holt, National Geospatial-Intelligence Agency
Jon Kosloski, National Security Agency
David Loveall, Federal Bureau of Investigation
Whitney Nelson, National Geospatial-Intelligence Agency

National Aeronautics and Space Administration
James Benardini, NASA Jet Propulsion Laboratory
Jin-Woo Han, NASA Ames Research Center
Michele Manuel, University of Florida
Andrew Molthan, NASA Marshall Space Flight Center
Colleen Mouw, Michigan Technological University
Vikram Shyam, NASA Glenn Research Center

National Science Foundation
Adam Abate, University of California at San Francisco
Marcel Agueros, Columbia University
Arezoo Ardekani, University of Notre Dame
Cullen Buie, Massachusetts Institute of Technology
Erin Carlson, Indiana University
Antonius Dieker, Georgia Tech Research Corporation
Erika Edwards, Brown University
Julia Grigsby, Boston College
Todd Gureckis, New York University
Tessa Hill, University of California - Davis
Daniel Krashen, University of Georgia
Rahul Mangharam, University of Pennsylvania
David Masiello, University of Washington
Daniel McCloskey, College of Staten Island, City University of New York
Shwetak Patel, University of Washington
Aaron Roth, University of Pennsylvania
Sayeef Salahuddin, University of California, Berkeley
Jakita Thomas, Spelman College
Joachim Walther, University of Georgia
Kristen Wendell, University of Massachusetts-Boston
Benjamin Williams, University of California-Los Angeles

2014 

On January 9, 2017, President Obama presented the following scientists with the award for 2014:

Department of Agriculture
 Michelle Cilia, USDA Agricultural Research Service
 Pankaj Lal, Montclair State University
 Michael Ulyshen, USDA Forest Service

Department of Commerce
 Nicholas Butch, NIST Center for Neutron Research
 Mandy Karnauskas, NOAA Fisheries
 Anne Perring, University of Colorado, Boulder
 Corey Potvin, University of Oklahoma
 John Teufel, NIST Physical Measurement Laboratory
 Justin Zook, NIST Material Measurement Laboratory

Department of Defense
 Michael Bell, Colorado State University
 Nurcin Celik, University of Miami
 Kaushik Chowdhury, Northeastern University
 Shawn Douglas, University of California, San Francisco
 Christopher Dyer, DeepMind and Carnegie Mellon University
 Aaron Esser-Kahn, University of California, Irvine
 Sinan Keten, Northwestern University
 Jonathan Fan, Stanford University
 Danna Freedman, Northwestern University
 Thomas Harris, Northwestern University
 David Hsieh, California Institute of Technology
 Osama Nayfeh, Space and Naval Warfare Systems Center-Pacific
 Olukayode Okusaga, Johns Hopkins Applied Physics Laboratory
 Joseph Parker, U.S. Naval Research Laboratory
 Adam Pilchak, Air Force Research Laboratory
 Harris Wang, Columbia University

Department of Education
 Daphna Bassok, University of Virginia
 Shayne Piasta, The Ohio State University

Department of Energy
 Jonathan Belof, Lawrence Livermore National Laboratory
 Carl Dahl, Northwestern University
 Eric Duoss, Lawrence Livermore National Laboratory
 Anna Grassellino, Fermi National Accelerator Laboratory
 Jacqueline Hakala, National Energy Technology Laboratory
 Stephanie Hansen, Sandia National Laboratories
 Kory Hedman, Arizona State University
 Alan Kruizenga, Sandia National Laboratories
 Wei Li, Rice University
 Guglielmo Scovazzi, Duke University
 Michael Tonks, Penn State University
 Jenny Yang, University of California, Irvine
 John Yeager, Los Alamos National Laboratory

Department of Health and Human Services
 Gregory Alushin, Rockefeller University
 Manish Arora, Icahn School of Medicine at Mount Sinai
 Dawn Cornelison, University of Missouri
 Kashmira Date, Centers for Disease Control and Prevention
 Craig Duvall, Vanderbilt University
 Nicholas Gilpin, Louisiana State University Health Sciences Center
 Anna Greka, Brigham and Women's Hospital
 Pamela Guerrerio, National Institutes of Health
 Gery Guy, Jr., Centers for Disease Control and Prevention
 Christine Hendon, Columbia University
 Catherine Karr, University of Washington
 Maria Lehtinen, Boston Children's Hospital
 Adriana Lleras-Muney, University of California, Los Angeles
 Mary Kay Lobo, University of Maryland School of Medicine
 Michael McAlpine, University of Minnesota
 Eric Morrow, Brown University
 Daniel O'Connor, Johns Hopkins University
 Aimee Shen, Tufts University
 Cui Tao, University of Texas
 Jacquelyn Taylor, Yale School of Nursing
 Benjamin Voight, University of Pennsylvania
 Matthew Wheeler, Centers for Disease Control and Prevention
 Blake Wiedenheft, Montana State University

Department of the Interior
 Nathaniel Hitt, U.S. Geological Survey
 Sarah Minson, U.S. Geological Survey
 Diann Prosser, U.S. Geological Survey

Department of Veterans Affairs
 Adam Rose, RAND Corporation and Boston Medical Center
 Nasia Safdar, Middleton Memorial Veterans Hospital
 Joshua Yarrow, U.S. Department of Veterans Affairs

Environmental Protection Agency
 Havala Pye, Environmental Protection Agency
 Sala Senkayi, Environmental Protection Agency

Intelligence Community
 Matthew Dicken, U.S. Army
 Josiah Dykstra, National Security Agency
 James Kang, National Geospatial-Intelligence Agency
 Jason Matheny, Office of the Director of National Intelligence
 David Moehring, IonQ, Inc.
 R. Jacob Vogelstein, Intelligence Advanced Research Projects Activity

National Aeronautics and Space Administration
 Jeremy Bassis, University of Michigan
 Othmane Benafan, NASA Glenn Research Center
 Dalia Kirschbaum, NASA Goddard Space Flight Center
 Marco Pavone, Stanford University
 Miguel Roman, NASA Goddard Space Flight Center

National Science Foundation
 Alicia Alonzo, Michigan State University
 Randy Ewoldt, University of Illinois at Urbana-Champaign
 Emily Fox, University of Washington
 Jacob Fox, Stanford University
 Eric Hudson, University of California, Los Angeles
 Shawn Jordan, Arizona State University
 Ahmad Khalil, Boston University
 Oleg Komogortsev, Texas State University, San Marcos
 John Kovac, Harvard University
 Bérénice Mettler, University of Minnesota and icuemotion, LLC
 Jelani Nelson, Harvard University
 Elizabeth Nolan, Massachusetts Institute of Technology
 Michael Rotkowitz, University of Maryland, College Park
 Andrea Sweigart, University of Georgia
 Chuanbing Tang, University of South Carolina
 Aradhna Tripati, University of California, Los Angeles
 Franck Vernerey, University of Colorado, Boulder
 Juan Pablo Vielma Centeno, Massachusetts Institute of Technology
 Makeba Wilbourn, Duke University

Smithsonian Institution
 Nicholas Pyenson, Smithsonian Institution

2015
In 2015, President Barack Obama announced the recipients of the award for 2015:

to-do

2016
On February 18, 2016, President Barack Obama announced the following scientists to receive the award in 2016:

Department of Agriculture

Renee Arias, National Peanut Research Laboratory

Matthew Thompson, Rocky Mountain Research Station

Kenong Xu, Cornell University

Department of Commerce

Nathan Bacheler, National Oceanic and Atmospheric Administration

Adam Creuziger, National Institute of Standards and Technology

Gijs de Boer, National Oceanic and Atmospheric Administration and University of Colorado-Boulder

Tara Lovestead, National Institute of Standards and Technology

Andrew Ludlow, National Institute of Standards and Technology

James Thorson, National Oceanic and Atmospheric Administration

Department of Defense

Pieter Abbeel, University of California-Berkeley

Deji Akinwande, University of Texas-Austin

Jin-Hee Cho, US Army Research Laboratory

Sarah Cowie, University of Nevada-Reno

Dino Di Carlo, University of California-Los Angeles

Alon Gorodetsky, University of California-Irvine

Elad Harel, Northwestern University

Patrick Hopkins, University of Virginia

Anya Jones, University of Maryland

Colin Joye, Naval Research Laboratory

Lena Kourkoutis, Cornell University

Jennifer Miksis-Olds, Pennsylvania State University

Timothy Ombrello, Air Force Research Laboratory

Heather Pidcoke, US Army Institute of Surgical Research

James Rondinelli, Drexel University

Bozhi Tian, University of Chicago

Luke Zettlemoyer, University of Washington

Department of Education

Christopher Lemons, Peabody College of Vanderbilt University

Cynthia Puranik, University of Pittsburgh

Department of Energy

Tonio Buonassisi, Massachusetts Institute of Technology

Milind Kulkarni, Purdue University

Keji Lai, University of Texas-Austin

Paul Ohodnicki, Jr., National Energy Technology Laboratory

Michelle O'Malley, University of California, Santa Barbara

Matthias Schindler, University of South Carolina

Jonathan Simon, University of Chicago

Michael Stadler, Lawrence Berkeley National Laboratory

Melissa Teague, Idaho National Laboratory

William Tisdale, Massachusetts Institute of Technology

Jonathan Hopkins, University of California, Los Angeles

Tammy Ma, Lawrence Livermore National Laboratory

David Mascareñas, Los Alamos National Laboratory

Department of Health and Human Services

Hillel Adesnik, University of California, Berkeley

Cheryl Broussard, Centers for Disease Control and Prevention

Samantha Brugmann, Cincinnati Children’s Hospital Medical Center

Namandje Bumpus, Johns Hopkins University

Jacob Carr, Centers for Disease Control and Prevention

Kafui Dzirasa, Duke University

Camilla Forsberg, University of California, Santa Cruz

Tina Goldstein, University of Pittsburgh

Viviana Gradinaru, California Institute of Technology

Jordan Green, Johns Hopkins University

Katie Kindt, National Institutes of Health

Andre Larochelle, National Institutes of Health

Jennifer Lorvick, RTI International

Courtney Miller, The Scripps Research Institute

Kiran Musunuru, Harvard University

David Pagliarini, University of Wisconsin – Madison

Sachin Patel, Vanderbilt University

Amy Ralston, University of California Santa Cruz

Carrie Reed, Centers for Disease Control and Prevention

Ervin Sejdic, University of Pittsburgh

Elizabeth Skidmore, University of Pittsburgh

Kay Tye, Massachusetts Institute of Technology

Muhammad Walji, The University of Texas School of Dentistry at Houston

Department of Interior

Richard Briggs, U.S. Geological Survey

Jeffrey Pigati, U.S. Geological Survey

Maureen Purcell, U.S. Geological Survey

Department of Veterans Affairs

Paul Marasco, Louis Stokes Cleveland VA Medical Center

Panagiotis Roussos, James J. Peters VA Medical Center

Erika Wolf, VA Boston Healthcare System

Environmental Protection Agency

Rebecca Dodder, EPA

Alex Marten, EPA

Intelligence Community

Kregg Arms, National Security Agency

Nicole Bohannon, Central Intelligence Agency

Ashley Holt, National Geospatial-Intelligence Agency

Jon Kosloski, National Security Agency

David Loveall, Federal Bureau of Investigation

Whitney Nelson, National Geospatial-Intelligence Agency

National Aeronautics and Space Administration

James Benardini, NASA Jet Propulsion Laboratory

Jin-Woo Han, NASA Ames Research Center

Michele Manuel, University of Florida

Andrew Molthan, NASA Marshall Space Flight Center

Colleen Mouw, Michigan Technological University

Vikram Shyam, NASA Glenn Research Center

National Science Foundation

Adam Abate, University of California at San Francisco

Marcel Agueros, Columbia University

Arezoo Ardekani, University of Notre Dame

Cullen Buie, Massachusetts Institute of Technology

Erin Carlson, Indiana University

Antonius Dieker, Georgia Tech Research Corporation

Erika Edwards, Brown University

Julia Grigsby, Boston College

Todd Gureckis, New York University

Tessa Hill, University of California - Davis

Daniel Krashen, University of Georgia

Rahul Mangharam, University of Pennsylvania

David Masiello, University of Washington

Daniel McCloskey, College of Staten Island, City University of New York

Shwetak Patel, University of Washington

Aaron Roth, University of Pennsylvania

Sayeef Salahuddin, University of California, Berkeley

Jakita Thomas, Spelman College

Joachim Walther, University of Georgia

Kristen Wendell, University of Massachusetts-Boston

Benjamin Williams, University of California-Los Angeles

Recipients are listed with their affiliated institution as of their nomination.

2017
On July 2, 2019, President Trump announced 27 recipients of the award for 2017:

to-do

2019

On July 2, 2019, President Trump announced the following recipients of the award, completing awards for the 2015, 2016, and 2017 classes:

Department of Agriculture
Sean Parks, Rocky Mountain Research Station
Heather K. Allen, National Animal Disease Center
Jo Anne Crouch, Systematic Mycology and Microbiology Laboratory
Jennifer Kao-Kniffin, Cornell University
Sara Lupton, Red River Valley Agricultural Research Center
David Bell, Pacific Northwest Research Station
Megan O'Rourke, Virginia Polytechnic Institute and State University

Department of Commerce
Elizabeth Siddon, National Oceanic and Atmospheric Administration National Marine Fisheries Service,  Alaska Fisheries Science Center
Andrew Hoell, National Oceanic and Atmospheric Administration Office of Oceanic and Atmospheric Research Earth System Research Laboratory
Brian McDonald, Cooperative Institute for Research in Environmental Sciences
Andrew Rollins, University of Colorado – Cooperative Institute for Research in Environmental Science
Melissa Soldevilla, National Oceanic and Atmospheric Administration Fisheries Southeast Fisheries Science Center
Michelle Barbieri, Pacific Islands Fisheries Science Center
Edwin Chan, National Institute of Standards and Technology Material Measurement Laboratory
Alexey Gorshkov, National Institute of Standards and Technology Physical Measurement Laboratory
Behrang Hamadani, National Institute of Standards and Technology Engineering Laboratory
Stephen Jordan, National Institute of Standards and Technology Information Technology Laboratory
Kathryn Keenan, National Institute of Standards and Technology Physical Measurement Laboratory
David Long, National Institute of Standards and Technology Material Measurement Laboratory
Elijah Petersen, National Institute of Standards and Technology Material Measurement Laboratory
Franklyn Quinlan, National Institute of Standards and Technology Physical Measurement Laboratory
Laura Sinclair, National Institute of Standards and Technology Physical Measurement Laboratory
Varun Verma, National Institute of Standards and Technology Physical Measurement Laboratory
Eric Anderson, National Oceanic and Atmospheric Administration Great Lakes Environmental Research Laboratory
Jeffrey Snyder, Cooperative Institute for Mesoscale Meteorology

Department of Defense
Martin Heimbeck, Army Materiel Command,  Research Development and Engineering Command,  Aviation and Missile Research Development and Engineering Command
Yuji Zhao, Arizona State University
Hugh Churchill, University of Arkansas
Phillip Christopher, University of California – Riverside
Nathaniel Gabor, University of California – Riverside
Javad Lavaei, University of California – Berkeley
Percy Liang, Stanford University
Austin Minnich, California Institute of Technology
Piya Pal, University of California – San Diego
Padmini Rangamani, University of California – San Diego
Monika Schleier-Smith, Stanford University
Jenny Suckale, Stanford University
Gordon Wetzstein, Stanford University
Andrea Young, University of California – Santa Barbara
Domenic Forte, University of Florida
Dhruv Batra, Georgia Institute of Technology
Matthew McDowell, Georgia Institute of Technology
Gaurav Bahl, University of Illinois – Urbana-Champaign
Timothy Berkelbach, University of Chicago
Pinshane Huang, University of Illinois – Urbana-Champaign
Nathan Lazarus, U.S. Army Research Laboratory
Ashley Ruth, U.S. Army Communications-Electronics Research,  Development and Engineering Center
Joseph Checkelsky, Massachusetts Institute of Technology
Benedetto Marelli, Massachusetts Institute of Technology
Yogesh Surendranath, Massachusetts Institute of Technology
Conor Walsh, Harvard University
Bharat Jalan, University of Minnesota – Twin Cities
William Heard, United States Army Corps of Engineers Engineer Research and Development Center
Jinglin Fu, Rutgers University – Camden
James Hing, Naval Air Warfare Center Aircraft Division
Jeff Thompson, Princeton University
Blair Johnson, University at Buffalo
Roseanna Zia, Cornell University
James LeBeau, North Carolina State University
Reginald Cooper, Air Force Research Laboratory Sensors Directorate
Daniel Garmann, Air Force Research Laboratory
Griffin Romigh, Air Force Research Lab 711th HPW/RHCB
Yuejie Chi, Carnegie-Mellon University
Kin Fai Mak, Pennsylvania State University
Robert Hernandez, Naval Undersea Warfare Center Division – Newport
Anita Shukla, Brown University
Katharine Tibbetts, Virginia Commonwealth University
Steven Brunton, University of Washington
Jiun-Haw Chu, University of Washington
Brandon Cochenour, Naval Air Warfare Center Aircraft Division
Adam Dunkelberger, U.S. Naval Research Laboratory
Volker Sorger, George Washington University

Department of Education
Karen Thompson, Oregon State University
Suzanne Adlof, University of South Carolina
Sarah Powell, University of Texas – Austin
Candace Walkington, Southern Methodist University
Tricia Zucker, University of Texas Medical School – Houston
Benjamin Castleman, University of Virginia

Department of Energy
Félicie Albert, Lawrence Livermore National Laboratory
Daniel Casey, Lawrence Livermore National Laboratory
Jim Ciston, Lawrence Berkeley National Laboratory
Jacklyn Gates, Lawrence Berkeley National Laboratory
Richard Kraus, Lawrence Livermore National Laboratory
Shiwoo Lee, National Energy Technology Laboratory
Lin Lin, University of California – Berkeley
Arthur Pak, Lawrence Livermore National Laboratory
Timothy Silverman, National Renewable Energy Laboratory
Michael Wagner, National Renewable Energy Laboratory
Stephanie Law, University of Delaware – Newark
Vivek Agarwal, Idaho National Laboratory
Krzysztof Gofryk, Idaho National Laboratory
Christopher Zarzana, Idaho National Laboratory
Matthew Dietrich, Argonne National Laboratory
Henry Hoffmann, University of Chicago
Julia Shelton, University of Illinois – Urbana-Champaign
Rebecca Schulman, Johns Hopkins University
Yen-Jie Lee, Massachusetts Institute of Technology
Tracy Slatyer, Massachusetts Institute of Technology
Erik Grumstrup, Montana State University
Marylesa Howard, Nevada National Security Site
Salvatore Campione, Sandia National Laboratories
Matthew Gomez, Sandia National Laboratories
Abigail Hunter, Los Alamos National Laboratory
Shea Mosby, Los Alamos National Laboratory
Paul Schmit, Sandia National Laboratories
Irina Tezaur, Sandia National Laboratories
Thomas Hartman, Cornell University
Kelly Wrighton, Ohio State University – Columbus
Douglas Kauffman, National Energy Technology Laboratory
Jordan Musser, National Energy Technology Laboratory
David Cullen, Oak Ridge National Laboratory
Katharine Page, Oak Ridge National Laboratory
Justin Stevens, College of William and Mary
Alvin Cheung, University of Washington
Kevin Schneider, Pacific Northwest National Laboratory
Jonathan Engle, University of Wisconsin – Madison
Victor Zavala, University of Wisconsin – Madison

Department of Health and Human Services
Eiman Azim, Salk Institute for Biological Studies
Sanjay Basu, Stanford University
Scott Boyd, Stanford University School of Medicine
Adriana Galván, University of California – Los Angeles
Shafali Jeste, University of California – Los Angeles
Zachary Knight, University of California – San Francisco School of Medicine
Darren Lipomi, University of California – San Diego
Michelle Monje, Stanford University
James Olzmann, University of California – Berkeley
Carolyn I. Rodriguez, Stanford University
Wenjun Zhang, University of California – Berkeley
Elena Gracheva, Yale University School of Medicine
Anne Marie France, Centers for Disease Control and Prevention
Emily Haas, Centers for Disease Control and Prevention
Matthew Maenner, Centers for Disease Control and Prevention
Lucy McNamara, National Center for Infectious Diseases
Subbian Panayampalli, National Center for Emerging and Zoonotic Infectious Diseases
Oduyebo Titilope, National Center for Chronic Disease Prevention and Health Promotion
Binnian Wei, Centers for Disease Control and Prevention
Lana Garmire, University of Hawaii at Manoa
Daniel Llano, University of Illinois – Urbana-Champaign
Joel Voss, Northwestern University
Jeremy Greenlee, University of Iowa
John Brognard, National Institutes of Health
Darrell Gaskin, Johns Hopkins University
Donna Gogerdchi, University of Maryland School of Medicine
Silvana Goldszmid, National Institutes of Health
Christopher Hourigan, National Institutes of Health
Katherine McJunkin, National Institutes of Health
Adam Phillippy, National Institutes of Health
Anish Thomas, National Institutes of Health
Catherine Weisz, National Institutes of Health
Kwanghun Chung, Massachusetts Institute of Technology
Sarah Collins, Brigham and Women’s Hospital
Felipe Fregni, Harvard Medical School
Eric Greer, Harvard Medical School
John Harris, University of Massachusetts Medical School
Amy Janes, Harvard Medical School
Steve Ramirez, Harvard University
Conor Walsh, Harvard Medical School
Jessica Whited, Harvard Medical School
Joanne Kahlenberg, University of Michigan Medical School
Colter Mitchell, University of Michigan
Moriah Thomason, Wayne State University
Melena Bellin, University of Minnesota
Angela Pannier, University of Nebraska – Lincoln
Jennifer Gillette, University of New Mexico Health Sciences Center
Sandeep Mallipattu, Stony Brook School of Medicine
Ian Maze, Icahn School of Medicine at Mount Sinai
Priya Rajasethupathy, Rockefeller University
Neville Sanjana, New York Genome Center
Jason Sheltzer, Cold Spring Harbor Laboratory
Ron Alterovitz, University of North Carolina – Chapel Hill
Michael Boyce, Duke University School of Medicine
Chandra Jackson, National Institutes of Health
Jennifer Martinez, National Institutes of Health
Spencer Smith, University of North Carolina – Chapel Hill
Tracey Yap, Duke University
Sohini Ramachandran, Brown University
Meenakshi Madhur, Vanderbilt University
Namkee Choi, University of Texas – Austin
Katherine King, Baylor College of Medicine
David Zhang, Rice University
Kory Lavine, Washington University School of Medicine
Sara Lindstroem, University of Washington
Elizabeth Nance, University of Washington
Xudong Wang, University of Wisconsin – Madison

Department of the Interior
Annemarie Baltay, Earthquake Science Center
Aaron Wech, Volcano Science Center
Heather Wright, Volcano Science Center
Brian Ebel, National Research Program
Celestine Mercer, Central Mineral and Environmental Resources Science Center
Patricia Dalyander, St. Petersburg Coastal and Marine Science Center
Nedal Nassar, National Minerals Information Center
Jeffrey Lorch, National Wildlife Health Center

Department of Veterans Affairs
Eric Chang, San Diego VA Healthcare System
David Clark, Malcom Randall VA Medical Center
Jason Wertheim, Jesse Brown VA Medical Center
Walid Gellad, VA Pittsburgh Healthcare System

Environmental Protection Agency
Carlie LaLone, Environmental Protection Agency
Jon Sobus, Environmental Protection Agency

Intelligence Community
Rodney Blakestad, Intelligence Advanced Research Projects Activity
Christopher Boehnen, Intelligence Advanced Research Projects Activity
Sean Carrick, National Security Agency
Kristin DeWitt, Intelligence Advanced Research Projects Activity
Candice Gerstner, National Security Agency
Seth Goldstein, Intelligence Advanced Research Projects Activity
Alexis Jeannotte, Intelligence Advanced Research Projects Activity
Jonas Kibelbek, National Security Agency
David Markowitz, Intelligence Advanced Research Projects Activity
Katelyn Meixner, National Security Agency
Sean Weaver, National Security Agency
Timothy Burchfield, University of Texas – Dallas
Elizabeth Bernstein, National Geospatial-Intelligence Agency
Hak Jae Kim, National Geospatial-Intelligence Agency
Matthew Klaric, National Geospatial-Intelligence Agency
Frances Lacagnina, National Geospatial-Intelligence Agency
Alexis Truitt, National Geospatial-Intelligence Agency

National Aeronautics and Space Administration
Jennifer Barrila, Arizona State University
Lynn Carter, University of Arizona
Laura Barge, National Aeronautics and Space Administration Jet Propulsion Laboratory
Erika Hamden, California Institute of Technology
John Reager, National Aeronautics and Space Administration Jet Propulsion Laboratory
Jonathan Sauder, National Aeronautics and Space Administration Jet Propulsion Laboratory
David Smith, National Aeronautics and Space Administration Ames Research Center
Gioia Massa, Kennedy Space Center
Kelly Stephani, University of Illinois – Urbana-Champaign
Abigail Vieregg, University of Chicago
Rebecca Kramer, Purdue University
Giada Arney, Goddard Space Flight Center
Shawn Domagal-Goldman, Goddard Space Flight Center
Jennifer Stern, Goddard Space Flight Center
Evan Pineda, National Aeronautics and Space Administration Glenn Research Center
Mark Blenner, Clemson University
Richard Moore, Langley Research Center
Yolanda Shea, Langley Research Center

National Science Foundation
Karolina Mukhtar, University of Alabama – Birmingham
Sefaattin Tongay, Arizona State University
Lynette Cegelski, Stanford University
Anca Dragan, University of California – Berkeley
Heather Knutson, California Institute of Technology
Percy Liang, Stanford University
Christian Linder, Stanford University
Thomas Maimone, University of California – Berkeley
Suveen Mathaudhu, University of California – Riverside
Aaron Parsons, University of California – Berkeley
Thomas Vidick, California Institute of Technology
Matei Zaharia, Stanford University
Jamil Zaki, Stanford University
Eric Toberer, Colorado School of Mines
Marie Coppola, University of Connecticut
Mary-Louise Timmermans, Yale University
Fengnian Xia, Yale University
Aysegul Gunduz, University of Florida
Erinn Muller, Mote Marine Laboratory and Aquarium
Maitane Olabarrieta, University of Florida
Mark Davenport, Georgia Institute of Technology
Christopher Jett, University of West Georgia
Paula Lemons, University of Georgia
Tara Hudiburg, University of Idaho
Danna Freedman, Northwestern University
Prashant Jain, University of Illinois – Urbana-Champaign
Mar Reguant, Northwestern University
Amanda Hummon, University of Notre Dame
Mary Murphy, Indiana University
Megan Thielges, Indiana University – Bloomington
Pinar Zorlutuna, University of Notre Dame
Alexandre Shvartsburg, Wichita State University
Christina Payne, University of Kentucky Research Foundation
Christopher Jewell, University of Maryland – College Park
Nathaniel Hendren, Harvard University
Barna Saha, University of Massachusetts – Amherst
Cara Stepp, Boston University
Christine Aidala, University of Michigan – Ann Arbor
Corinna Schindler, University of Michigan
Dominik Schillinger, University of Minnesota
John McCutcheon, University of Montana
Marilyne Stains, University of Nebraska – Lincoln
Xia Zhou, Dartmouth College
Amir Ali Ahmadi, Princeton University
Han Liu, Princeton University
Arvind Narayanan, Princeton University
Alejandro Rodriguez, Princeton University
Jessica Ware, Rutgers University – Newark
Saman Zonouz, Rutgers University
Luis Campos, Columbia University
Cory Dean, Columbia University
Joanna Kiryluk, Stony Brook University
Qiang Lin, University of Rochester
Kristin Myers, Columbia University
Rebecca Slayton, Cornell University
Linwei Wang, Rochester Institute of Technology
Roseanna Zia, Cornell University
Lorena Bociu, North Carolina State University
Nicolas Cassar, Duke University
Hsiao-Ying Shadow Huang, North Carolina State University
Lillian Pierce, Duke University
Jennifer Carter, Case Western Reserve University
Philip Feng, Case Western Reserve University
Chuan Xue, Ohio State University
Po-Shen Loh, Carnegie-Mellon University
Edward O'Brien, Pennsylvania State University
Tak-Sing Wong, Pennsylvania State University
Christopher Wright, Drexel University
Whitney Behr, University of Texas – Austin
James Howison, University of Texas – Austin
Todd Humphreys, University of Texas – Austin
Matthew Walsh, University of Texas – Arlington
Idalis Villanueva, Utah State University
Nitya Kallivayalil, University of Virginia
Matthew Kirwan, College of William and Mary Virginia Institute of Marine Science
Megan Wawro, Virginia Polytechnic Institute & State University
Laura Prugh, University of Washington
Chunlei Liang, George Washington University
Erika Marin-Spiotta, University of Wisconsin
Jeff Clune, University of Wyoming

Smithsonian Institution
Kristina Teixeira, Smithsonian Institution

See also 
 Presidential Young Investigator Award

Notes

References

External links 
 NIH Intramural Research Program Recipients of the PECASE Award

Federal government of the United States
American science and technology awards
Career awards
Early career awards
Awards established in 1996
1996 establishments in the United States